

494001–494100 

|-bgcolor=#d6d6d6
| 494001 ||  || — || January 30, 2011 || Haleakala || Pan-STARRS || — || align=right | 2.6 km || 
|-id=002 bgcolor=#E9E9E9
| 494002 ||  || — || September 11, 2010 || Mount Lemmon || Mount Lemmon Survey || (5) || align=right data-sort-value="0.91" | 910 m || 
|-id=003 bgcolor=#d6d6d6
| 494003 ||  || — || October 5, 2004 || Kitt Peak || Spacewatch || KOR || align=right | 1.3 km || 
|-id=004 bgcolor=#d6d6d6
| 494004 ||  || — || April 2, 2011 || Mount Lemmon || Mount Lemmon Survey || VER || align=right | 2.4 km || 
|-id=005 bgcolor=#E9E9E9
| 494005 ||  || — || February 14, 2008 || Mount Lemmon || Mount Lemmon Survey || — || align=right | 1.2 km || 
|-id=006 bgcolor=#fefefe
| 494006 ||  || — || November 26, 2003 || Kitt Peak || Spacewatch || V || align=right data-sort-value="0.58" | 580 m || 
|-id=007 bgcolor=#fefefe
| 494007 ||  || — || December 15, 2004 || Kitt Peak || Spacewatch || V || align=right data-sort-value="0.72" | 720 m || 
|-id=008 bgcolor=#E9E9E9
| 494008 ||  || — || January 19, 2008 || Mount Lemmon || Mount Lemmon Survey || MAR || align=right | 2.2 km || 
|-id=009 bgcolor=#d6d6d6
| 494009 ||  || — || February 27, 2010 || WISE || WISE || — || align=right | 3.8 km || 
|-id=010 bgcolor=#d6d6d6
| 494010 ||  || — || April 8, 2010 || WISE || WISE || EUP || align=right | 4.2 km || 
|-id=011 bgcolor=#E9E9E9
| 494011 ||  || — || December 8, 2005 || Kitt Peak || Spacewatch || HOF || align=right | 3.0 km || 
|-id=012 bgcolor=#d6d6d6
| 494012 ||  || — || September 20, 2014 || Haleakala || Pan-STARRS || 7:4 || align=right | 4.6 km || 
|-id=013 bgcolor=#d6d6d6
| 494013 ||  || — || April 9, 2010 || WISE || WISE || — || align=right | 5.4 km || 
|-id=014 bgcolor=#d6d6d6
| 494014 ||  || — || December 10, 2009 || Mount Lemmon || Mount Lemmon Survey || — || align=right | 2.5 km || 
|-id=015 bgcolor=#d6d6d6
| 494015 ||  || — || October 28, 2008 || Mount Lemmon || Mount Lemmon Survey || — || align=right | 2.7 km || 
|-id=016 bgcolor=#d6d6d6
| 494016 ||  || — || September 21, 2009 || Mount Lemmon || Mount Lemmon Survey || — || align=right | 2.4 km || 
|-id=017 bgcolor=#d6d6d6
| 494017 ||  || — || March 11, 2011 || Mount Lemmon || Mount Lemmon Survey || — || align=right | 2.6 km || 
|-id=018 bgcolor=#d6d6d6
| 494018 ||  || — || March 13, 2011 || Catalina || CSS || — || align=right | 2.9 km || 
|-id=019 bgcolor=#d6d6d6
| 494019 ||  || — || March 15, 2007 || Kitt Peak || Spacewatch || — || align=right | 2.1 km || 
|-id=020 bgcolor=#d6d6d6
| 494020 ||  || — || November 19, 2003 || Kitt Peak || Spacewatch || — || align=right | 3.9 km || 
|-id=021 bgcolor=#d6d6d6
| 494021 ||  || — || October 16, 2009 || Catalina || CSS || — || align=right | 2.6 km || 
|-id=022 bgcolor=#d6d6d6
| 494022 ||  || — || May 1, 2000 || Kitt Peak || Spacewatch || — || align=right | 3.5 km || 
|-id=023 bgcolor=#d6d6d6
| 494023 ||  || — || September 27, 2013 || Haleakala || Pan-STARRS || — || align=right | 2.8 km || 
|-id=024 bgcolor=#d6d6d6
| 494024 ||  || — || March 13, 2011 || Mount Lemmon || Mount Lemmon Survey || — || align=right | 3.4 km || 
|-id=025 bgcolor=#d6d6d6
| 494025 ||  || — || April 1, 2010 || WISE || WISE || — || align=right | 3.9 km || 
|-id=026 bgcolor=#E9E9E9
| 494026 ||  || — || March 16, 2012 || Mount Lemmon || Mount Lemmon Survey || GEF || align=right | 2.2 km || 
|-id=027 bgcolor=#E9E9E9
| 494027 ||  || — || April 7, 2013 || Kitt Peak || Spacewatch || — || align=right | 1.3 km || 
|-id=028 bgcolor=#d6d6d6
| 494028 ||  || — || October 21, 1995 || Kitt Peak || Spacewatch || — || align=right | 1.9 km || 
|-id=029 bgcolor=#E9E9E9
| 494029 ||  || — || September 30, 2010 || Mount Lemmon || Mount Lemmon Survey || — || align=right | 1.4 km || 
|-id=030 bgcolor=#E9E9E9
| 494030 ||  || — || October 13, 2010 || Mount Lemmon || Mount Lemmon Survey || NEM || align=right | 2.2 km || 
|-id=031 bgcolor=#E9E9E9
| 494031 ||  || — || December 15, 2006 || Kitt Peak || Spacewatch || — || align=right | 3.1 km || 
|-id=032 bgcolor=#E9E9E9
| 494032 ||  || — || January 30, 2012 || Kitt Peak || Spacewatch || — || align=right | 1.9 km || 
|-id=033 bgcolor=#d6d6d6
| 494033 ||  || — || November 18, 2003 || Kitt Peak || Spacewatch || — || align=right | 3.3 km || 
|-id=034 bgcolor=#d6d6d6
| 494034 ||  || — || October 27, 2014 || Haleakala || Pan-STARRS || — || align=right | 3.2 km || 
|-id=035 bgcolor=#d6d6d6
| 494035 ||  || — || November 6, 2010 || Mount Lemmon || Mount Lemmon Survey || — || align=right | 2.1 km || 
|-id=036 bgcolor=#d6d6d6
| 494036 ||  || — || September 27, 2009 || Mount Lemmon || Mount Lemmon Survey || — || align=right | 2.2 km || 
|-id=037 bgcolor=#d6d6d6
| 494037 ||  || — || December 18, 2004 || Mount Lemmon || Mount Lemmon Survey || THM || align=right | 2.1 km || 
|-id=038 bgcolor=#E9E9E9
| 494038 ||  || — || November 1, 2005 || Mount Lemmon || Mount Lemmon Survey || AGN || align=right | 1.6 km || 
|-id=039 bgcolor=#E9E9E9
| 494039 ||  || — || October 23, 2006 || Mount Lemmon || Mount Lemmon Survey || — || align=right | 1.5 km || 
|-id=040 bgcolor=#d6d6d6
| 494040 ||  || — || March 15, 2010 || WISE || WISE || — || align=right | 3.2 km || 
|-id=041 bgcolor=#d6d6d6
| 494041 ||  || — || July 1, 2013 || Haleakala || Pan-STARRS || — || align=right | 2.7 km || 
|-id=042 bgcolor=#E9E9E9
| 494042 ||  || — || September 28, 2000 || Kitt Peak || Spacewatch || AST || align=right | 2.0 km || 
|-id=043 bgcolor=#d6d6d6
| 494043 ||  || — || April 27, 2012 || Kitt Peak || Spacewatch || — || align=right | 3.4 km || 
|-id=044 bgcolor=#d6d6d6
| 494044 ||  || — || July 18, 2013 || Haleakala || Pan-STARRS || — || align=right | 3.1 km || 
|-id=045 bgcolor=#d6d6d6
| 494045 ||  || — || August 26, 2013 || Haleakala || Pan-STARRS || — || align=right | 2.5 km || 
|-id=046 bgcolor=#d6d6d6
| 494046 ||  || — || January 14, 2011 || Kitt Peak || Spacewatch || KOR || align=right | 1.1 km || 
|-id=047 bgcolor=#d6d6d6
| 494047 ||  || — || March 23, 2006 || Kitt Peak || Spacewatch || — || align=right | 2.2 km || 
|-id=048 bgcolor=#d6d6d6
| 494048 ||  || — || October 22, 2009 || Mount Lemmon || Mount Lemmon Survey || — || align=right | 2.8 km || 
|-id=049 bgcolor=#E9E9E9
| 494049 ||  || — || October 30, 2005 || Mount Lemmon || Mount Lemmon Survey || HOF || align=right | 2.7 km || 
|-id=050 bgcolor=#E9E9E9
| 494050 ||  || — || December 15, 2006 || Kitt Peak || Spacewatch || — || align=right | 2.0 km || 
|-id=051 bgcolor=#E9E9E9
| 494051 ||  || — || November 3, 2010 || Kitt Peak || Spacewatch || MRX || align=right data-sort-value="0.88" | 880 m || 
|-id=052 bgcolor=#d6d6d6
| 494052 ||  || — || December 18, 2009 || Kitt Peak || Spacewatch || — || align=right | 3.0 km || 
|-id=053 bgcolor=#d6d6d6
| 494053 ||  || — || March 26, 2011 || Mount Lemmon || Mount Lemmon Survey || EOS || align=right | 2.0 km || 
|-id=054 bgcolor=#fefefe
| 494054 ||  || — || November 9, 1999 || Socorro || LINEAR || MAS || align=right data-sort-value="0.83" | 830 m || 
|-id=055 bgcolor=#E9E9E9
| 494055 ||  || — || November 1, 2005 || Mount Lemmon || Mount Lemmon Survey || AGN || align=right | 1.3 km || 
|-id=056 bgcolor=#E9E9E9
| 494056 ||  || — || December 13, 2006 || Kitt Peak || Spacewatch || WIT || align=right data-sort-value="0.97" | 970 m || 
|-id=057 bgcolor=#d6d6d6
| 494057 ||  || — || January 30, 2011 || Haleakala || Pan-STARRS || — || align=right | 1.9 km || 
|-id=058 bgcolor=#d6d6d6
| 494058 ||  || — || March 10, 2005 || Mount Lemmon || Mount Lemmon Survey || — || align=right | 2.6 km || 
|-id=059 bgcolor=#d6d6d6
| 494059 ||  || — || February 12, 2010 || WISE || WISE || — || align=right | 2.3 km || 
|-id=060 bgcolor=#d6d6d6
| 494060 ||  || — || October 28, 2014 || Haleakala || Pan-STARRS || — || align=right | 2.9 km || 
|-id=061 bgcolor=#d6d6d6
| 494061 ||  || — || February 10, 2011 || Mount Lemmon || Mount Lemmon Survey || — || align=right | 2.4 km || 
|-id=062 bgcolor=#d6d6d6
| 494062 ||  || — || August 7, 2008 || Kitt Peak || Spacewatch || — || align=right | 2.5 km || 
|-id=063 bgcolor=#E9E9E9
| 494063 ||  || — || October 25, 2005 || Kitt Peak || Spacewatch || HOF || align=right | 2.4 km || 
|-id=064 bgcolor=#fefefe
| 494064 ||  || — || March 2, 2009 || Kitt Peak || Spacewatch || V || align=right data-sort-value="0.69" | 690 m || 
|-id=065 bgcolor=#d6d6d6
| 494065 ||  || — || September 5, 1999 || Kitt Peak || Spacewatch || KOR  KAR || align=right | 1.3 km || 
|-id=066 bgcolor=#d6d6d6
| 494066 ||  || — || July 15, 2013 || Haleakala || Pan-STARRS || — || align=right | 3.0 km || 
|-id=067 bgcolor=#E9E9E9
| 494067 ||  || — || March 27, 2012 || Mount Lemmon || Mount Lemmon Survey || — || align=right | 2.4 km || 
|-id=068 bgcolor=#E9E9E9
| 494068 ||  || — || September 22, 2006 || Catalina || CSS || — || align=right | 1.2 km || 
|-id=069 bgcolor=#d6d6d6
| 494069 ||  || — || September 16, 2014 || Haleakala || Pan-STARRS || — || align=right | 2.7 km || 
|-id=070 bgcolor=#d6d6d6
| 494070 ||  || — || April 7, 2006 || Kitt Peak || Spacewatch || — || align=right | 2.9 km || 
|-id=071 bgcolor=#d6d6d6
| 494071 ||  || — || December 16, 2009 || Mount Lemmon || Mount Lemmon Survey || — || align=right | 2.4 km || 
|-id=072 bgcolor=#d6d6d6
| 494072 ||  || — || April 2, 2010 || WISE || WISE || URS || align=right | 3.4 km || 
|-id=073 bgcolor=#E9E9E9
| 494073 ||  || — || February 16, 2012 || Haleakala || Pan-STARRS || — || align=right | 2.0 km || 
|-id=074 bgcolor=#d6d6d6
| 494074 ||  || — || January 7, 2010 || Kitt Peak || Spacewatch || — || align=right | 3.9 km || 
|-id=075 bgcolor=#d6d6d6
| 494075 ||  || — || September 3, 2013 || Haleakala || Pan-STARRS || 7:4 || align=right | 3.5 km || 
|-id=076 bgcolor=#d6d6d6
| 494076 ||  || — || October 1, 2008 || Kitt Peak || Spacewatch || — || align=right | 2.2 km || 
|-id=077 bgcolor=#E9E9E9
| 494077 ||  || — || August 18, 2009 || Kitt Peak || Spacewatch || AGN || align=right | 2.2 km || 
|-id=078 bgcolor=#d6d6d6
| 494078 ||  || — || February 9, 2005 || Kitt Peak || Spacewatch || — || align=right | 3.1 km || 
|-id=079 bgcolor=#d6d6d6
| 494079 ||  || — || December 18, 2009 || Kitt Peak || Spacewatch || — || align=right | 2.7 km || 
|-id=080 bgcolor=#fefefe
| 494080 ||  || — || October 11, 1977 || Palomar || PLS || — || align=right data-sort-value="0.72" | 720 m || 
|-id=081 bgcolor=#d6d6d6
| 494081 ||  || — || February 1, 2005 || Kitt Peak || Spacewatch || TIR || align=right | 2.7 km || 
|-id=082 bgcolor=#d6d6d6
| 494082 ||  || — || August 15, 2013 || Haleakala || Pan-STARRS || — || align=right | 2.3 km || 
|-id=083 bgcolor=#E9E9E9
| 494083 ||  || — || February 17, 2007 || Kitt Peak || Spacewatch || WIT || align=right | 1.9 km || 
|-id=084 bgcolor=#d6d6d6
| 494084 ||  || — || March 9, 2005 || Mount Lemmon || Mount Lemmon Survey || HYG || align=right | 2.2 km || 
|-id=085 bgcolor=#d6d6d6
| 494085 ||  || — || February 7, 1999 || Kitt Peak || Spacewatch || — || align=right | 3.4 km || 
|-id=086 bgcolor=#d6d6d6
| 494086 ||  || — || February 24, 2006 || Kitt Peak || Spacewatch || — || align=right | 2.3 km || 
|-id=087 bgcolor=#d6d6d6
| 494087 ||  || — || September 3, 2007 || Catalina || CSS || — || align=right | 4.6 km || 
|-id=088 bgcolor=#d6d6d6
| 494088 ||  || — || October 12, 2009 || Mount Lemmon || Mount Lemmon Survey || — || align=right | 2.5 km || 
|-id=089 bgcolor=#E9E9E9
| 494089 ||  || — || October 28, 2005 || Mount Lemmon || Mount Lemmon Survey || HOF || align=right | 2.9 km || 
|-id=090 bgcolor=#d6d6d6
| 494090 ||  || — || October 9, 2008 || Mount Lemmon || Mount Lemmon Survey || EOS || align=right | 1.9 km || 
|-id=091 bgcolor=#d6d6d6
| 494091 ||  || — || October 10, 2004 || Kitt Peak || Spacewatch || KOR  KAR || align=right | 1.4 km || 
|-id=092 bgcolor=#d6d6d6
| 494092 ||  || — || February 26, 2007 || Mount Lemmon || Mount Lemmon Survey || — || align=right | 2.4 km || 
|-id=093 bgcolor=#d6d6d6
| 494093 ||  || — || September 21, 2003 || Kitt Peak || Spacewatch || — || align=right | 3.1 km || 
|-id=094 bgcolor=#d6d6d6
| 494094 ||  || — || March 12, 2011 || Mount Lemmon || Mount Lemmon Survey || — || align=right | 2.7 km || 
|-id=095 bgcolor=#d6d6d6
| 494095 ||  || — || January 15, 2005 || Kitt Peak || Spacewatch || — || align=right | 2.6 km || 
|-id=096 bgcolor=#d6d6d6
| 494096 ||  || — || November 11, 2009 || Mount Lemmon || Mount Lemmon Survey || — || align=right | 1.9 km || 
|-id=097 bgcolor=#d6d6d6
| 494097 ||  || — || January 26, 2006 || Kitt Peak || Spacewatch || TEL || align=right | 1.6 km || 
|-id=098 bgcolor=#d6d6d6
| 494098 ||  || — || February 9, 2010 || Mount Lemmon || Mount Lemmon Survey || — || align=right | 3.2 km || 
|-id=099 bgcolor=#d6d6d6
| 494099 ||  || — || November 18, 2003 || Kitt Peak || Spacewatch || — || align=right | 2.7 km || 
|-id=100 bgcolor=#d6d6d6
| 494100 ||  || — || October 4, 1999 || Kitt Peak || Spacewatch || KOR || align=right | 1.2 km || 
|}

494101–494200 

|-bgcolor=#d6d6d6
| 494101 ||  || — || February 25, 2011 || Mount Lemmon || Mount Lemmon Survey || — || align=right | 2.3 km || 
|-id=102 bgcolor=#E9E9E9
| 494102 ||  || — || November 25, 2005 || Mount Lemmon || Mount Lemmon Survey || AST || align=right | 1.6 km || 
|-id=103 bgcolor=#d6d6d6
| 494103 ||  || — || January 21, 2006 || Kitt Peak || Spacewatch || KOR || align=right | 1.2 km || 
|-id=104 bgcolor=#d6d6d6
| 494104 ||  || — || January 26, 2006 || Mount Lemmon || Mount Lemmon Survey || KOR || align=right | 1.2 km || 
|-id=105 bgcolor=#E9E9E9
| 494105 ||  || — || January 26, 2007 || Kitt Peak || Spacewatch || AGN || align=right | 1.2 km || 
|-id=106 bgcolor=#d6d6d6
| 494106 ||  || — || December 13, 2004 || Kitt Peak || Spacewatch || — || align=right | 2.3 km || 
|-id=107 bgcolor=#E9E9E9
| 494107 ||  || — || October 28, 2005 || Kitt Peak || Spacewatch || — || align=right | 1.9 km || 
|-id=108 bgcolor=#d6d6d6
| 494108 ||  || — || November 8, 2009 || Mount Lemmon || Mount Lemmon Survey || — || align=right | 2.2 km || 
|-id=109 bgcolor=#fefefe
| 494109 ||  || — || September 5, 2007 || Catalina || CSS || V || align=right data-sort-value="0.77" | 770 m || 
|-id=110 bgcolor=#d6d6d6
| 494110 ||  || — || March 2, 2011 || Kitt Peak || Spacewatch || (1298) || align=right | 3.2 km || 
|-id=111 bgcolor=#d6d6d6
| 494111 ||  || — || January 19, 1994 || Kitt Peak || Spacewatch || EOS || align=right | 2.4 km || 
|-id=112 bgcolor=#d6d6d6
| 494112 ||  || — || October 23, 2014 || Mount Lemmon || Mount Lemmon Survey || — || align=right | 3.1 km || 
|-id=113 bgcolor=#d6d6d6
| 494113 ||  || — || September 27, 2003 || Kitt Peak || Spacewatch || — || align=right | 2.9 km || 
|-id=114 bgcolor=#E9E9E9
| 494114 ||  || — || March 1, 2012 || Mount Lemmon || Mount Lemmon Survey || EUN || align=right | 1.2 km || 
|-id=115 bgcolor=#d6d6d6
| 494115 ||  || — || September 22, 2014 || Haleakala || Pan-STARRS || ALA || align=right | 3.1 km || 
|-id=116 bgcolor=#d6d6d6
| 494116 ||  || — || July 29, 2009 || Kitt Peak || Spacewatch || — || align=right | 2.9 km || 
|-id=117 bgcolor=#d6d6d6
| 494117 ||  || — || May 6, 2006 || Mount Lemmon || Mount Lemmon Survey || — || align=right | 3.6 km || 
|-id=118 bgcolor=#d6d6d6
| 494118 ||  || — || July 29, 2008 || Mount Lemmon || Mount Lemmon Survey || — || align=right | 2.6 km || 
|-id=119 bgcolor=#d6d6d6
| 494119 ||  || — || August 26, 2013 || Haleakala || Pan-STARRS || — || align=right | 3.1 km || 
|-id=120 bgcolor=#d6d6d6
| 494120 ||  || — || September 10, 2013 || Haleakala || Pan-STARRS || EOS || align=right | 2.3 km || 
|-id=121 bgcolor=#d6d6d6
| 494121 ||  || — || August 23, 2014 || Haleakala || Pan-STARRS || TIR || align=right | 3.0 km || 
|-id=122 bgcolor=#d6d6d6
| 494122 ||  || — || January 30, 2011 || Haleakala || Pan-STARRS || — || align=right | 2.4 km || 
|-id=123 bgcolor=#E9E9E9
| 494123 ||  || — || October 17, 2010 || Catalina || CSS || — || align=right | 1.5 km || 
|-id=124 bgcolor=#d6d6d6
| 494124 ||  || — || May 16, 2012 || Mount Lemmon || Mount Lemmon Survey || EOS || align=right | 1.3 km || 
|-id=125 bgcolor=#d6d6d6
| 494125 ||  || — || January 30, 2006 || Kitt Peak || Spacewatch || — || align=right | 1.8 km || 
|-id=126 bgcolor=#d6d6d6
| 494126 ||  || — || October 23, 2003 || Kitt Peak || Spacewatch || — || align=right | 2.7 km || 
|-id=127 bgcolor=#fefefe
| 494127 ||  || — || December 19, 2004 || Mount Lemmon || Mount Lemmon Survey || — || align=right data-sort-value="0.75" | 750 m || 
|-id=128 bgcolor=#E9E9E9
| 494128 ||  || — || January 12, 2002 || Kitt Peak || Spacewatch || HOF || align=right | 3.2 km || 
|-id=129 bgcolor=#d6d6d6
| 494129 ||  || — || March 4, 2005 || Mount Lemmon || Mount Lemmon Survey || EOS || align=right | 3.2 km || 
|-id=130 bgcolor=#d6d6d6
| 494130 ||  || — || February 4, 2011 || Haleakala || Pan-STARRS || EOS || align=right | 1.9 km || 
|-id=131 bgcolor=#d6d6d6
| 494131 ||  || — || December 12, 2004 || Kitt Peak || Spacewatch || — || align=right | 2.5 km || 
|-id=132 bgcolor=#d6d6d6
| 494132 ||  || — || January 28, 2011 || Mount Lemmon || Mount Lemmon Survey || — || align=right | 1.8 km || 
|-id=133 bgcolor=#d6d6d6
| 494133 ||  || — || November 17, 2014 || Mount Lemmon || Mount Lemmon Survey || — || align=right | 2.4 km || 
|-id=134 bgcolor=#d6d6d6
| 494134 ||  || — || May 15, 2012 || Mount Lemmon || Mount Lemmon Survey || EOS || align=right | 1.7 km || 
|-id=135 bgcolor=#d6d6d6
| 494135 ||  || — || April 19, 2006 || Kitt Peak || Spacewatch || EOS || align=right | 2.9 km || 
|-id=136 bgcolor=#d6d6d6
| 494136 ||  || — || May 19, 2012 || Haleakala || Pan-STARRS || EOS || align=right | 1.3 km || 
|-id=137 bgcolor=#E9E9E9
| 494137 ||  || — || January 9, 2002 || Socorro || LINEAR || GEF || align=right | 1.4 km || 
|-id=138 bgcolor=#d6d6d6
| 494138 ||  || — || June 14, 2012 || Mount Lemmon || Mount Lemmon Survey || 7:4 || align=right | 3.5 km || 
|-id=139 bgcolor=#d6d6d6
| 494139 ||  || — || March 13, 2010 || WISE || WISE || GEF  EOS || align=right | 4.1 km || 
|-id=140 bgcolor=#d6d6d6
| 494140 ||  || — || November 19, 2003 || Kitt Peak || Spacewatch || THM || align=right | 2.5 km || 
|-id=141 bgcolor=#d6d6d6
| 494141 ||  || — || October 25, 2014 || Mount Lemmon || Mount Lemmon Survey || — || align=right | 2.9 km || 
|-id=142 bgcolor=#d6d6d6
| 494142 ||  || — || November 21, 2014 || Haleakala || Pan-STARRS || — || align=right | 3.0 km || 
|-id=143 bgcolor=#E9E9E9
| 494143 ||  || — || February 8, 2007 || Kitt Peak || Spacewatch || — || align=right | 2.4 km || 
|-id=144 bgcolor=#d6d6d6
| 494144 ||  || — || June 21, 2007 || Mount Lemmon || Mount Lemmon Survey || — || align=right | 3.5 km || 
|-id=145 bgcolor=#d6d6d6
| 494145 ||  || — || February 21, 2006 || Mount Lemmon || Mount Lemmon Survey || KOR || align=right | 1.4 km || 
|-id=146 bgcolor=#d6d6d6
| 494146 ||  || — || March 8, 2005 || Mount Lemmon || Mount Lemmon Survey || THM || align=right | 1.8 km || 
|-id=147 bgcolor=#d6d6d6
| 494147 ||  || — || October 6, 2008 || Mount Lemmon || Mount Lemmon Survey || — || align=right | 3.2 km || 
|-id=148 bgcolor=#d6d6d6
| 494148 ||  || — || May 21, 2006 || Kitt Peak || Spacewatch || — || align=right | 3.9 km || 
|-id=149 bgcolor=#d6d6d6
| 494149 ||  || — || September 22, 2009 || Kitt Peak || Spacewatch || KOR || align=right | 1.3 km || 
|-id=150 bgcolor=#d6d6d6
| 494150 ||  || — || April 2, 2010 || WISE || WISE || LUT || align=right | 3.6 km || 
|-id=151 bgcolor=#d6d6d6
| 494151 ||  || — || November 2, 2008 || Mount Lemmon || Mount Lemmon Survey || — || align=right | 3.9 km || 
|-id=152 bgcolor=#d6d6d6
| 494152 ||  || — || February 28, 2006 || Catalina || CSS || — || align=right | 3.6 km || 
|-id=153 bgcolor=#d6d6d6
| 494153 ||  || — || May 27, 2010 || WISE || WISE || — || align=right | 4.9 km || 
|-id=154 bgcolor=#fefefe
| 494154 ||  || — || May 4, 2005 || Mount Lemmon || Mount Lemmon Survey || — || align=right data-sort-value="0.74" | 740 m || 
|-id=155 bgcolor=#E9E9E9
| 494155 ||  || — || December 13, 2010 || Mount Lemmon || Mount Lemmon Survey || — || align=right | 2.4 km || 
|-id=156 bgcolor=#d6d6d6
| 494156 ||  || — || October 25, 2014 || Haleakala || Pan-STARRS || HYG || align=right | 2.4 km || 
|-id=157 bgcolor=#E9E9E9
| 494157 ||  || — || February 26, 2012 || Haleakala || Pan-STARRS || — || align=right | 1.2 km || 
|-id=158 bgcolor=#C7FF8F
| 494158 ||  || — || January 16, 2013 || Haleakala || Pan-STARRS || centaur || align=right | 12 km || 
|-id=159 bgcolor=#d6d6d6
| 494159 ||  || — || August 15, 2013 || Haleakala || Pan-STARRS || — || align=right | 3.1 km || 
|-id=160 bgcolor=#d6d6d6
| 494160 ||  || — || April 17, 2010 || WISE || WISE || — || align=right | 3.9 km || 
|-id=161 bgcolor=#d6d6d6
| 494161 ||  || — || November 20, 2008 || Mount Lemmon || Mount Lemmon Survey || — || align=right | 2.7 km || 
|-id=162 bgcolor=#d6d6d6
| 494162 ||  || — || September 6, 2013 || Mount Lemmon || Mount Lemmon Survey || — || align=right | 2.7 km || 
|-id=163 bgcolor=#d6d6d6
| 494163 ||  || — || December 21, 2014 || Haleakala || Pan-STARRS || 3:2 || align=right | 3.4 km || 
|-id=164 bgcolor=#d6d6d6
| 494164 ||  || — || October 8, 2007 || Mount Lemmon || Mount Lemmon Survey || — || align=right | 2.3 km || 
|-id=165 bgcolor=#E9E9E9
| 494165 ||  || — || December 30, 2005 || Kitt Peak || Spacewatch || — || align=right | 1.6 km || 
|-id=166 bgcolor=#fefefe
| 494166 ||  || — || April 20, 2009 || Kitt Peak || Spacewatch || — || align=right data-sort-value="0.65" | 650 m || 
|-id=167 bgcolor=#d6d6d6
| 494167 ||  || — || September 18, 2007 || Kitt Peak || Spacewatch || — || align=right | 2.4 km || 
|-id=168 bgcolor=#E9E9E9
| 494168 ||  || — || April 1, 2008 || Kitt Peak || Spacewatch || — || align=right | 1.0 km || 
|-id=169 bgcolor=#d6d6d6
| 494169 ||  || — || November 5, 2007 || Mount Lemmon || Mount Lemmon Survey || THM || align=right | 2.5 km || 
|-id=170 bgcolor=#d6d6d6
| 494170 ||  || — || September 28, 2008 || Mount Lemmon || Mount Lemmon Survey || KOR  KAR || align=right | 1.3 km || 
|-id=171 bgcolor=#d6d6d6
| 494171 ||  || — || October 11, 2007 || Kitt Peak || Spacewatch || HYG || align=right | 3.0 km || 
|-id=172 bgcolor=#fefefe
| 494172 ||  || — || September 19, 2003 || Kitt Peak || Spacewatch || (2076) || align=right | 1.1 km || 
|-id=173 bgcolor=#fefefe
| 494173 ||  || — || January 29, 1995 || Kitt Peak || Spacewatch || — || align=right data-sort-value="0.67" | 670 m || 
|-id=174 bgcolor=#E9E9E9
| 494174 ||  || — || February 6, 2007 || Kitt Peak || Spacewatch || — || align=right | 1.2 km || 
|-id=175 bgcolor=#d6d6d6
| 494175 ||  || — || September 18, 2007 || Kitt Peak || Spacewatch || — || align=right | 2.9 km || 
|-id=176 bgcolor=#fefefe
| 494176 ||  || — || January 21, 2012 || Haleakala || Pan-STARRS || — || align=right data-sort-value="0.76" | 760 m || 
|-id=177 bgcolor=#d6d6d6
| 494177 ||  || — || September 23, 2008 || Mount Lemmon || Mount Lemmon Survey || — || align=right | 2.2 km || 
|-id=178 bgcolor=#d6d6d6
| 494178 ||  || — || April 5, 2010 || Mount Lemmon || Mount Lemmon Survey || EOS || align=right | 2.8 km || 
|-id=179 bgcolor=#E9E9E9
| 494179 ||  || — || October 5, 2005 || Catalina || CSS || — || align=right | 1.5 km || 
|-id=180 bgcolor=#d6d6d6
| 494180 ||  || — || March 3, 2006 || Kitt Peak || Spacewatch || — || align=right | 3.2 km || 
|-id=181 bgcolor=#d6d6d6
| 494181 ||  || — || March 11, 2005 || Kitt Peak || Spacewatch || THM || align=right | 2.9 km || 
|-id=182 bgcolor=#d6d6d6
| 494182 ||  || — || February 15, 2010 || Catalina || CSS || — || align=right | 2.8 km || 
|-id=183 bgcolor=#d6d6d6
| 494183 ||  || — || May 18, 2010 || WISE || WISE || — || align=right | 2.9 km || 
|-id=184 bgcolor=#d6d6d6
| 494184 ||  || — || October 30, 2008 || Kitt Peak || Spacewatch || EOS || align=right | 2.4 km || 
|-id=185 bgcolor=#E9E9E9
| 494185 ||  || — || April 29, 2003 || Socorro || LINEAR || — || align=right | 1.6 km || 
|-id=186 bgcolor=#E9E9E9
| 494186 ||  || — || March 9, 2011 || Mount Lemmon || Mount Lemmon Survey || — || align=right | 2.4 km || 
|-id=187 bgcolor=#d6d6d6
| 494187 ||  || — || October 3, 1999 || Kitt Peak || Spacewatch || KOR || align=right | 1.4 km || 
|-id=188 bgcolor=#fefefe
| 494188 ||  || — || May 17, 2001 || Kitt Peak || Spacewatch || — || align=right data-sort-value="0.88" | 880 m || 
|-id=189 bgcolor=#d6d6d6
| 494189 ||  || — || October 23, 2003 || Kitt Peak || Spacewatch || — || align=right | 2.5 km || 
|-id=190 bgcolor=#d6d6d6
| 494190 ||  || — || March 9, 2005 || Mount Lemmon || Mount Lemmon Survey || — || align=right | 2.9 km || 
|-id=191 bgcolor=#E9E9E9
| 494191 ||  || — || October 3, 2013 || Kitt Peak || Spacewatch || — || align=right | 2.1 km || 
|-id=192 bgcolor=#E9E9E9
| 494192 ||  || — || September 29, 2005 || Mount Lemmon || Mount Lemmon Survey || — || align=right data-sort-value="0.89" | 890 m || 
|-id=193 bgcolor=#d6d6d6
| 494193 ||  || — || February 14, 2010 || Mount Lemmon || Mount Lemmon Survey || KOR || align=right | 1.6 km || 
|-id=194 bgcolor=#d6d6d6
| 494194 ||  || — || May 13, 2010 || WISE || WISE || — || align=right | 3.7 km || 
|-id=195 bgcolor=#d6d6d6
| 494195 ||  || — || October 11, 2012 || Haleakala || Pan-STARRS || — || align=right | 2.2 km || 
|-id=196 bgcolor=#fefefe
| 494196 ||  || — || May 1, 2006 || Kitt Peak || Spacewatch || — || align=right data-sort-value="0.64" | 640 m || 
|-id=197 bgcolor=#d6d6d6
| 494197 ||  || — || October 25, 2013 || Mount Lemmon || Mount Lemmon Survey || — || align=right | 2.6 km || 
|-id=198 bgcolor=#E9E9E9
| 494198 ||  || — || February 6, 2007 || Mount Lemmon || Mount Lemmon Survey || — || align=right data-sort-value="0.87" | 870 m || 
|-id=199 bgcolor=#fefefe
| 494199 ||  || — || April 11, 2005 || Mount Lemmon || Mount Lemmon Survey || NYS || align=right data-sort-value="0.65" | 650 m || 
|-id=200 bgcolor=#d6d6d6
| 494200 ||  || — || April 2, 2005 || Kitt Peak || Spacewatch || — || align=right | 2.2 km || 
|}

494201–494300 

|-bgcolor=#E9E9E9
| 494201 ||  || — || December 20, 2009 || Kitt Peak || Spacewatch || MRX || align=right | 1.2 km || 
|-id=202 bgcolor=#fefefe
| 494202 ||  || — || February 26, 2001 || Cima Ekar || ADAS || — || align=right data-sort-value="0.87" | 870 m || 
|-id=203 bgcolor=#fefefe
| 494203 ||  || — || February 27, 2006 || Kitt Peak || Spacewatch || — || align=right data-sort-value="0.71" | 710 m || 
|-id=204 bgcolor=#d6d6d6
| 494204 ||  || — || April 5, 2005 || Mount Lemmon || Mount Lemmon Survey || — || align=right | 2.5 km || 
|-id=205 bgcolor=#d6d6d6
| 494205 ||  || — || October 28, 2008 || Kitt Peak || Spacewatch || EOS || align=right | 1.8 km || 
|-id=206 bgcolor=#E9E9E9
| 494206 ||  || — || December 9, 2006 || Kitt Peak || Spacewatch || — || align=right | 1.00 km || 
|-id=207 bgcolor=#d6d6d6
| 494207 ||  || — || February 1, 2005 || Kitt Peak || Spacewatch || — || align=right | 2.2 km || 
|-id=208 bgcolor=#E9E9E9
| 494208 ||  || — || February 2, 2006 || Kitt Peak || Spacewatch || HOF || align=right | 2.0 km || 
|-id=209 bgcolor=#d6d6d6
| 494209 ||  || — || November 5, 2007 || Kitt Peak || Spacewatch || — || align=right | 3.4 km || 
|-id=210 bgcolor=#E9E9E9
| 494210 ||  || — || November 9, 2009 || Kitt Peak || Spacewatch || (5) || align=right data-sort-value="0.71" | 710 m || 
|-id=211 bgcolor=#E9E9E9
| 494211 ||  || — || October 12, 2013 || Mount Lemmon || Mount Lemmon Survey || — || align=right | 1.6 km || 
|-id=212 bgcolor=#d6d6d6
| 494212 ||  || — || December 2, 2008 || Kitt Peak || Spacewatch || HYG || align=right | 2.4 km || 
|-id=213 bgcolor=#fefefe
| 494213 ||  || — || January 1, 2008 || Mount Lemmon || Mount Lemmon Survey || — || align=right data-sort-value="0.85" | 850 m || 
|-id=214 bgcolor=#d6d6d6
| 494214 ||  || — || November 6, 2013 || Haleakala || Pan-STARRS || — || align=right | 3.3 km || 
|-id=215 bgcolor=#fefefe
| 494215 ||  || — || July 22, 2006 || Mount Lemmon || Mount Lemmon Survey || — || align=right data-sort-value="0.76" | 760 m || 
|-id=216 bgcolor=#d6d6d6
| 494216 ||  || — || September 20, 2001 || Socorro || LINEAR || — || align=right | 2.7 km || 
|-id=217 bgcolor=#d6d6d6
| 494217 ||  || — || February 17, 2004 || Kitt Peak || Spacewatch || — || align=right | 2.8 km || 
|-id=218 bgcolor=#E9E9E9
| 494218 ||  || — || July 18, 2013 || Haleakala || Pan-STARRS || EUN || align=right | 1.3 km || 
|-id=219 bgcolor=#C7FF8F
| 494219 ||  || — || September 23, 2012 || Mount Lemmon || Mount Lemmon Survey || Tj (2.43) || align=right | 13 km || 
|-id=220 bgcolor=#d6d6d6
| 494220 ||  || — || October 24, 2011 || Haleakala || Pan-STARRS || THB || align=right | 1.6 km || 
|-id=221 bgcolor=#E9E9E9
| 494221 ||  || — || February 14, 2010 || Mount Lemmon || Mount Lemmon Survey || — || align=right | 1.2 km || 
|-id=222 bgcolor=#E9E9E9
| 494222 ||  || — || February 10, 2014 || Haleakala || Pan-STARRS || — || align=right | 1.3 km || 
|-id=223 bgcolor=#E9E9E9
| 494223 ||  || — || December 14, 2013 || Mount Lemmon || Mount Lemmon Survey || (5) || align=right data-sort-value="0.92" | 920 m || 
|-id=224 bgcolor=#fefefe
| 494224 ||  || — || December 16, 2006 || Mount Lemmon || Mount Lemmon Survey || — || align=right | 1.1 km || 
|-id=225 bgcolor=#d6d6d6
| 494225 ||  || — || August 22, 2011 || La Sagra || OAM Obs. || EOS || align=right | 2.3 km || 
|-id=226 bgcolor=#d6d6d6
| 494226 ||  || — || May 15, 2008 || Mount Lemmon || Mount Lemmon Survey || (6124)3:2 || align=right | 5.7 km || 
|-id=227 bgcolor=#d6d6d6
| 494227 ||  || — || July 3, 2005 || Mount Lemmon || Mount Lemmon Survey || THM || align=right | 2.0 km || 
|-id=228 bgcolor=#E9E9E9
| 494228 ||  || — || December 4, 2008 || Mount Lemmon || Mount Lemmon Survey || — || align=right data-sort-value="0.90" | 900 m || 
|-id=229 bgcolor=#d6d6d6
| 494229 ||  || — || October 16, 2009 || Mount Lemmon || Mount Lemmon Survey || SHU3:2 || align=right | 5.3 km || 
|-id=230 bgcolor=#d6d6d6
| 494230 ||  || — || March 2, 2009 || Kitt Peak || Spacewatch || — || align=right | 2.5 km || 
|-id=231 bgcolor=#FA8072
| 494231 ||  || — || December 29, 2003 || Kitt Peak || Spacewatch || — || align=right | 1.5 km || 
|-id=232 bgcolor=#fefefe
| 494232 ||  || — || April 3, 2011 || Haleakala || Pan-STARRS || NYS || align=right data-sort-value="0.82" | 820 m || 
|-id=233 bgcolor=#E9E9E9
| 494233 ||  || — || September 22, 2003 || Kitt Peak || Spacewatch || — || align=right | 2.2 km || 
|-id=234 bgcolor=#d6d6d6
| 494234 ||  || — || October 9, 2007 || Kitt Peak || Spacewatch || — || align=right | 2.7 km || 
|-id=235 bgcolor=#d6d6d6
| 494235 ||  || — || November 25, 2000 || Kitt Peak || Spacewatch || HYG || align=right | 2.4 km || 
|-id=236 bgcolor=#E9E9E9
| 494236 ||  || — || April 4, 2010 || Kitt Peak || Spacewatch || HOF || align=right | 2.0 km || 
|-id=237 bgcolor=#E9E9E9
| 494237 ||  || — || September 14, 2004 || Anderson Mesa || LONEOS || — || align=right | 1.0 km || 
|-id=238 bgcolor=#d6d6d6
| 494238 ||  || — || December 18, 2007 || Kitt Peak || Spacewatch || EOS || align=right | 2.0 km || 
|-id=239 bgcolor=#d6d6d6
| 494239 ||  || — || January 14, 2008 || Kitt Peak || Spacewatch || — || align=right | 4.1 km || 
|-id=240 bgcolor=#d6d6d6
| 494240 ||  || — || October 6, 2012 || Kitt Peak || Spacewatch || — || align=right | 2.0 km || 
|-id=241 bgcolor=#E9E9E9
| 494241 ||  || — || October 6, 2012 || Haleakala || Pan-STARRS || GEF || align=right | 2.4 km || 
|-id=242 bgcolor=#d6d6d6
| 494242 ||  || — || January 10, 2008 || Desert Eagle || W. K. Y. Yeung || EOS || align=right | 2.1 km || 
|-id=243 bgcolor=#d6d6d6
| 494243 ||  || — || November 7, 2007 || Kitt Peak || Spacewatch || — || align=right | 2.1 km || 
|-id=244 bgcolor=#d6d6d6
| 494244 ||  || — || November 5, 2007 || Kitt Peak || Spacewatch || — || align=right | 2.3 km || 
|-id=245 bgcolor=#d6d6d6
| 494245 ||  || — || October 30, 1999 || Kitt Peak || Spacewatch || THB || align=right | 3.4 km || 
|-id=246 bgcolor=#fefefe
| 494246 ||  || — || January 12, 2010 || Mount Lemmon || Mount Lemmon Survey || — || align=right data-sort-value="0.86" | 860 m || 
|-id=247 bgcolor=#E9E9E9
| 494247 ||  || — || September 24, 2008 || Kitt Peak || Spacewatch || — || align=right | 1.1 km || 
|-id=248 bgcolor=#d6d6d6
| 494248 ||  || — || July 25, 2006 || Mount Lemmon || Mount Lemmon Survey || LAU || align=right | 2.0 km || 
|-id=249 bgcolor=#E9E9E9
| 494249 ||  || — || September 25, 2012 || Catalina || CSS || — || align=right data-sort-value="0.77" | 770 m || 
|-id=250 bgcolor=#d6d6d6
| 494250 ||  || — || October 1, 2011 || Kitt Peak || Spacewatch || EOS || align=right | 2.6 km || 
|-id=251 bgcolor=#E9E9E9
| 494251 ||  || — || November 30, 2005 || Kitt Peak || Spacewatch || — || align=right data-sort-value="0.83" | 830 m || 
|-id=252 bgcolor=#E9E9E9
| 494252 ||  || — || September 20, 2003 || Kitt Peak || Spacewatch || — || align=right | 1.4 km || 
|-id=253 bgcolor=#d6d6d6
| 494253 ||  || — || August 31, 2011 || Haleakala || Pan-STARRS || — || align=right | 2.3 km || 
|-id=254 bgcolor=#E9E9E9
| 494254 ||  || — || April 14, 2010 || Mount Lemmon || Mount Lemmon Survey || WIT || align=right | 1.9 km || 
|-id=255 bgcolor=#fefefe
| 494255 ||  || — || January 24, 2014 || Haleakala || Pan-STARRS || NYS || align=right data-sort-value="0.49" | 490 m || 
|-id=256 bgcolor=#d6d6d6
| 494256 ||  || — || September 12, 2005 || Kitt Peak || Spacewatch || — || align=right | 2.5 km || 
|-id=257 bgcolor=#E9E9E9
| 494257 ||  || — || August 24, 2012 || Kitt Peak || Spacewatch || (5) || align=right data-sort-value="0.70" | 700 m || 
|-id=258 bgcolor=#fefefe
| 494258 ||  || — || November 28, 2005 || Kitt Peak || Spacewatch || V || align=right data-sort-value="0.62" | 620 m || 
|-id=259 bgcolor=#fefefe
| 494259 ||  || — || February 9, 2008 || Mount Lemmon || Mount Lemmon Survey || — || align=right data-sort-value="0.65" | 650 m || 
|-id=260 bgcolor=#E9E9E9
| 494260 ||  || — || March 18, 2010 || Mount Lemmon || Mount Lemmon Survey || WIT || align=right | 2.2 km || 
|-id=261 bgcolor=#d6d6d6
| 494261 ||  || — || May 4, 2005 || Mount Lemmon || Mount Lemmon Survey || KOR || align=right | 1.3 km || 
|-id=262 bgcolor=#d6d6d6
| 494262 ||  || — || October 7, 2005 || Kitt Peak || Spacewatch || — || align=right | 2.6 km || 
|-id=263 bgcolor=#d6d6d6
| 494263 ||  || — || September 1, 2005 || Kitt Peak || Spacewatch || HYG || align=right | 2.4 km || 
|-id=264 bgcolor=#fefefe
| 494264 ||  || — || November 26, 2003 || Kitt Peak || Spacewatch || — || align=right data-sort-value="0.67" | 670 m || 
|-id=265 bgcolor=#d6d6d6
| 494265 ||  || — || November 21, 2006 || Mount Lemmon || Mount Lemmon Survey || EOS || align=right | 1.9 km || 
|-id=266 bgcolor=#d6d6d6
| 494266 ||  || — || November 1, 2006 || Mount Lemmon || Mount Lemmon Survey || EOS || align=right | 2.1 km || 
|-id=267 bgcolor=#d6d6d6
| 494267 ||  || — || October 11, 2007 || Kitt Peak || Spacewatch || — || align=right | 4.2 km || 
|-id=268 bgcolor=#d6d6d6
| 494268 ||  || — || November 4, 2012 || Kitt Peak || Spacewatch || — || align=right | 2.3 km || 
|-id=269 bgcolor=#d6d6d6
| 494269 ||  || — || October 19, 2006 || Kitt Peak || Spacewatch || HYG || align=right | 2.8 km || 
|-id=270 bgcolor=#d6d6d6
| 494270 ||  || — || August 31, 2011 || Haleakala || Pan-STARRS || — || align=right | 2.2 km || 
|-id=271 bgcolor=#E9E9E9
| 494271 ||  || — || November 19, 2008 || Mount Lemmon || Mount Lemmon Survey || critical || align=right | 1.0 km || 
|-id=272 bgcolor=#fefefe
| 494272 ||  || — || July 30, 2008 || Mount Lemmon || Mount Lemmon Survey || — || align=right data-sort-value="0.75" | 750 m || 
|-id=273 bgcolor=#E9E9E9
| 494273 ||  || — || October 8, 2007 || Catalina || CSS || — || align=right | 2.0 km || 
|-id=274 bgcolor=#E9E9E9
| 494274 ||  || — || September 28, 2003 || Kitt Peak || Spacewatch || EUN || align=right | 1.2 km || 
|-id=275 bgcolor=#E9E9E9
| 494275 ||  || — || November 7, 2012 || Kitt Peak || Spacewatch || (5) || align=right data-sort-value="0.77" | 770 m || 
|-id=276 bgcolor=#d6d6d6
| 494276 ||  || — || March 26, 2003 || Campo Imperatore || CINEOS || HYG || align=right | 4.1 km || 
|-id=277 bgcolor=#E9E9E9
| 494277 ||  || — || October 28, 2008 || Mount Lemmon || Mount Lemmon Survey || — || align=right | 2.0 km || 
|-id=278 bgcolor=#d6d6d6
| 494278 ||  || — || October 2, 2006 || Kitt Peak || Spacewatch || — || align=right | 2.2 km || 
|-id=279 bgcolor=#d6d6d6
| 494279 ||  || — || October 12, 2006 || Kitt Peak || Spacewatch || — || align=right | 2.2 km || 
|-id=280 bgcolor=#E9E9E9
| 494280 ||  || — || April 6, 2010 || Mount Lemmon || Mount Lemmon Survey || HOF || align=right | 1.8 km || 
|-id=281 bgcolor=#d6d6d6
| 494281 ||  || — || November 14, 2006 || Mount Lemmon || Mount Lemmon Survey || — || align=right | 2.4 km || 
|-id=282 bgcolor=#d6d6d6
| 494282 ||  || — || August 29, 2005 || Kitt Peak || Spacewatch || — || align=right | 3.0 km || 
|-id=283 bgcolor=#fefefe
| 494283 ||  || — || August 28, 1995 || Kitt Peak || Spacewatch || V || align=right data-sort-value="0.40" | 400 m || 
|-id=284 bgcolor=#fefefe
| 494284 ||  || — || November 18, 2009 || Kitt Peak || Spacewatch || — || align=right data-sort-value="0.63" | 630 m || 
|-id=285 bgcolor=#E9E9E9
| 494285 ||  || — || October 28, 2008 || Kitt Peak || Spacewatch || — || align=right | 1.2 km || 
|-id=286 bgcolor=#fefefe
| 494286 ||  || — || March 29, 2011 || Mount Lemmon || Mount Lemmon Survey || — || align=right data-sort-value="0.68" | 680 m || 
|-id=287 bgcolor=#E9E9E9
| 494287 ||  || — || September 10, 2007 || Kitt Peak || Spacewatch || AGN || align=right | 1.0 km || 
|-id=288 bgcolor=#d6d6d6
| 494288 ||  || — || November 5, 2007 || Kitt Peak || Spacewatch || — || align=right | 2.6 km || 
|-id=289 bgcolor=#d6d6d6
| 494289 ||  || — || January 10, 2008 || Catalina || CSS || — || align=right | 2.8 km || 
|-id=290 bgcolor=#fefefe
| 494290 ||  || — || November 27, 2009 || Mount Lemmon || Mount Lemmon Survey || — || align=right data-sort-value="0.83" | 830 m || 
|-id=291 bgcolor=#fefefe
| 494291 ||  || — || May 10, 2007 || Mount Lemmon || Mount Lemmon Survey || — || align=right | 1.1 km || 
|-id=292 bgcolor=#E9E9E9
| 494292 ||  || — || December 30, 2008 || Kitt Peak || Spacewatch || HOF || align=right | 2.3 km || 
|-id=293 bgcolor=#d6d6d6
| 494293 ||  || — || August 31, 2005 || Kitt Peak || Spacewatch || EOS || align=right | 1.8 km || 
|-id=294 bgcolor=#d6d6d6
| 494294 ||  || — || November 4, 2005 || Mount Lemmon || Mount Lemmon Survey || HYGfast? || align=right | 2.7 km || 
|-id=295 bgcolor=#fefefe
| 494295 ||  || — || March 28, 2011 || Mount Lemmon || Mount Lemmon Survey || — || align=right data-sort-value="0.65" | 650 m || 
|-id=296 bgcolor=#E9E9E9
| 494296 ||  || — || October 14, 2012 || Kitt Peak || Spacewatch || (5) || align=right data-sort-value="0.70" | 700 m || 
|-id=297 bgcolor=#d6d6d6
| 494297 ||  || — || October 3, 2006 || Mount Lemmon || Mount Lemmon Survey || — || align=right | 1.5 km || 
|-id=298 bgcolor=#E9E9E9
| 494298 ||  || — || October 15, 2012 || Kitt Peak || Spacewatch || — || align=right data-sort-value="0.79" | 790 m || 
|-id=299 bgcolor=#E9E9E9
| 494299 ||  || — || December 25, 2005 || Kitt Peak || Spacewatch || — || align=right | 1.1 km || 
|-id=300 bgcolor=#fefefe
| 494300 ||  || — || November 9, 2009 || Kitt Peak || Spacewatch || — || align=right | 2.1 km || 
|}

494301–494400 

|-bgcolor=#E9E9E9
| 494301 ||  || — || June 15, 2010 || WISE || WISE || — || align=right | 2.7 km || 
|-id=302 bgcolor=#E9E9E9
| 494302 ||  || — || September 17, 2003 || Kitt Peak || Spacewatch || EUN || align=right | 1.0 km || 
|-id=303 bgcolor=#fefefe
| 494303 ||  || — || September 29, 2005 || Anderson Mesa || LONEOS || — || align=right data-sort-value="0.96" | 960 m || 
|-id=304 bgcolor=#fefefe
| 494304 ||  || — || August 6, 2012 || Haleakala || Pan-STARRS || — || align=right data-sort-value="0.87" | 870 m || 
|-id=305 bgcolor=#fefefe
| 494305 ||  || — || October 1, 2005 || Catalina || CSS || NYS || align=right data-sort-value="0.54" | 540 m || 
|-id=306 bgcolor=#fefefe
| 494306 ||  || — || August 31, 2005 || Kitt Peak || Spacewatch || — || align=right data-sort-value="0.59" | 590 m || 
|-id=307 bgcolor=#d6d6d6
| 494307 ||  || — || October 25, 2005 || Kitt Peak || Spacewatch || THM || align=right | 2.4 km || 
|-id=308 bgcolor=#E9E9E9
| 494308 ||  || — || October 26, 2008 || Mount Lemmon || Mount Lemmon Survey || (5) || align=right data-sort-value="0.63" | 630 m || 
|-id=309 bgcolor=#E9E9E9
| 494309 ||  || — || February 25, 2006 || Kitt Peak || Spacewatch || — || align=right | 1.6 km || 
|-id=310 bgcolor=#fefefe
| 494310 ||  || — || July 8, 2008 || La Sagra || OAM Obs. || — || align=right data-sort-value="0.86" | 860 m || 
|-id=311 bgcolor=#E9E9E9
| 494311 ||  || — || July 31, 2011 || Haleakala || Pan-STARRS || — || align=right | 1.7 km || 
|-id=312 bgcolor=#fefefe
| 494312 ||  || — || April 25, 2003 || Kitt Peak || Spacewatch || — || align=right | 1.1 km || 
|-id=313 bgcolor=#E9E9E9
| 494313 ||  || — || March 18, 2010 || Kitt Peak || Spacewatch || AGN || align=right | 2.3 km || 
|-id=314 bgcolor=#E9E9E9
| 494314 ||  || — || November 15, 2003 || Kitt Peak || Spacewatch || — || align=right | 2.1 km || 
|-id=315 bgcolor=#d6d6d6
| 494315 ||  || — || August 31, 2000 || Socorro || LINEAR || — || align=right | 3.4 km || 
|-id=316 bgcolor=#E9E9E9
| 494316 ||  || — || April 22, 2007 || Kitt Peak || Spacewatch || — || align=right data-sort-value="0.84" | 840 m || 
|-id=317 bgcolor=#d6d6d6
| 494317 ||  || — || October 27, 2005 || Kitt Peak || Spacewatch || — || align=right | 2.6 km || 
|-id=318 bgcolor=#fefefe
| 494318 ||  || — || September 30, 2005 || Catalina || CSS || — || align=right | 1.1 km || 
|-id=319 bgcolor=#d6d6d6
| 494319 ||  || — || October 21, 2011 || Kitt Peak || Spacewatch || — || align=right | 2.6 km || 
|-id=320 bgcolor=#E9E9E9
| 494320 ||  || — || May 22, 2011 || Mount Lemmon || Mount Lemmon Survey || — || align=right | 1.2 km || 
|-id=321 bgcolor=#E9E9E9
| 494321 ||  || — || October 8, 2007 || Kitt Peak || Spacewatch || DOR || align=right | 2.9 km || 
|-id=322 bgcolor=#fefefe
| 494322 ||  || — || September 24, 2005 || Kitt Peak || Spacewatch || NYS || align=right data-sort-value="0.65" | 650 m || 
|-id=323 bgcolor=#d6d6d6
| 494323 ||  || — || March 11, 1996 || Kitt Peak || Spacewatch || — || align=right | 3.3 km || 
|-id=324 bgcolor=#d6d6d6
| 494324 ||  || — || September 29, 2010 || Mount Lemmon || Mount Lemmon Survey || — || align=right | 3.6 km || 
|-id=325 bgcolor=#d6d6d6
| 494325 ||  || — || October 27, 2000 || Socorro || LINEAR || — || align=right | 3.3 km || 
|-id=326 bgcolor=#d6d6d6
| 494326 ||  || — || October 25, 2011 || Haleakala || Pan-STARRS || — || align=right | 2.3 km || 
|-id=327 bgcolor=#E9E9E9
| 494327 ||  || — || August 28, 2006 || Kitt Peak || Spacewatch || — || align=right | 2.3 km || 
|-id=328 bgcolor=#d6d6d6
| 494328 ||  || — || September 22, 2011 || Kitt Peak || Spacewatch || — || align=right | 2.7 km || 
|-id=329 bgcolor=#d6d6d6
| 494329 ||  || — || November 16, 2006 || Mount Lemmon || Mount Lemmon Survey || — || align=right | 2.8 km || 
|-id=330 bgcolor=#d6d6d6
| 494330 ||  || — || February 12, 2008 || Kitt Peak || Spacewatch || — || align=right | 2.4 km || 
|-id=331 bgcolor=#d6d6d6
| 494331 ||  || — || November 17, 2006 || Kitt Peak || Spacewatch || EOS || align=right | 4.6 km || 
|-id=332 bgcolor=#fefefe
| 494332 ||  || — || September 20, 2009 || Kitt Peak || Spacewatch || — || align=right data-sort-value="0.73" | 730 m || 
|-id=333 bgcolor=#E9E9E9
| 494333 ||  || — || December 11, 2012 || Mount Lemmon || Mount Lemmon Survey || — || align=right | 1.8 km || 
|-id=334 bgcolor=#fefefe
| 494334 ||  || — || October 23, 2005 || Catalina || CSS || — || align=right data-sort-value="0.98" | 980 m || 
|-id=335 bgcolor=#d6d6d6
| 494335 ||  || — || December 11, 2006 || Kitt Peak || Spacewatch || EOS || align=right | 3.3 km || 
|-id=336 bgcolor=#d6d6d6
| 494336 ||  || — || August 29, 2005 || Kitt Peak || Spacewatch || EOS || align=right | 1.6 km || 
|-id=337 bgcolor=#E9E9E9
| 494337 ||  || — || April 25, 2006 || Mount Lemmon || Mount Lemmon Survey || — || align=right | 3.0 km || 
|-id=338 bgcolor=#fefefe
| 494338 ||  || — || January 13, 2010 || Mount Lemmon || Mount Lemmon Survey || V || align=right data-sort-value="0.61" | 610 m || 
|-id=339 bgcolor=#E9E9E9
| 494339 ||  || — || September 10, 2007 || Mount Lemmon || Mount Lemmon Survey || — || align=right | 1.9 km || 
|-id=340 bgcolor=#d6d6d6
| 494340 ||  || — || September 24, 2000 || Kitt Peak || Spacewatch || — || align=right | 1.9 km || 
|-id=341 bgcolor=#d6d6d6
| 494341 ||  || — || March 27, 2014 || Haleakala || Pan-STARRS || — || align=right | 2.7 km || 
|-id=342 bgcolor=#d6d6d6
| 494342 ||  || — || September 23, 2011 || Kitt Peak || Spacewatch || NAE || align=right | 2.5 km || 
|-id=343 bgcolor=#E9E9E9
| 494343 ||  || — || September 12, 2007 || Mount Lemmon || Mount Lemmon Survey || — || align=right | 1.3 km || 
|-id=344 bgcolor=#E9E9E9
| 494344 ||  || — || April 2, 2006 || Mount Lemmon || Mount Lemmon Survey || — || align=right | 1.7 km || 
|-id=345 bgcolor=#d6d6d6
| 494345 ||  || — || November 22, 2006 || Mount Lemmon || Mount Lemmon Survey || EOS || align=right | 1.6 km || 
|-id=346 bgcolor=#E9E9E9
| 494346 ||  || — || October 10, 2004 || Kitt Peak || Spacewatch || — || align=right data-sort-value="0.84" | 840 m || 
|-id=347 bgcolor=#fefefe
| 494347 ||  || — || August 13, 2012 || Haleakala || Pan-STARRS || NYS || align=right data-sort-value="0.62" | 620 m || 
|-id=348 bgcolor=#E9E9E9
| 494348 ||  || — || September 22, 2003 || Kitt Peak || Spacewatch || — || align=right | 1.2 km || 
|-id=349 bgcolor=#E9E9E9
| 494349 ||  || — || November 5, 1999 || Socorro || LINEAR || BAR || align=right | 1.8 km || 
|-id=350 bgcolor=#E9E9E9
| 494350 ||  || — || December 28, 1998 || Kitt Peak || Spacewatch || — || align=right | 2.6 km || 
|-id=351 bgcolor=#d6d6d6
| 494351 ||  || — || October 7, 2005 || Mount Lemmon || Mount Lemmon Survey || EOS || align=right | 2.6 km || 
|-id=352 bgcolor=#E9E9E9
| 494352 ||  || — || October 14, 1998 || Kitt Peak || Spacewatch || — || align=right | 1.8 km || 
|-id=353 bgcolor=#E9E9E9
| 494353 ||  || — || September 29, 2003 || Kitt Peak || Spacewatch || — || align=right | 1.4 km || 
|-id=354 bgcolor=#E9E9E9
| 494354 ||  || — || October 6, 1999 || Socorro || LINEAR || — || align=right | 1.4 km || 
|-id=355 bgcolor=#d6d6d6
| 494355 ||  || — || February 17, 2013 || Kitt Peak || Spacewatch || — || align=right | 2.6 km || 
|-id=356 bgcolor=#d6d6d6
| 494356 ||  || — || October 29, 2005 || Mount Lemmon || Mount Lemmon Survey || — || align=right | 2.9 km || 
|-id=357 bgcolor=#E9E9E9
| 494357 ||  || — || January 20, 2009 || Catalina || CSS || — || align=right data-sort-value="0.93" | 930 m || 
|-id=358 bgcolor=#d6d6d6
| 494358 ||  || — || September 28, 2006 || Kitt Peak || Spacewatch || KOR || align=right | 1.5 km || 
|-id=359 bgcolor=#d6d6d6
| 494359 ||  || — || September 25, 2005 || Catalina || CSS || EOS || align=right | 2.1 km || 
|-id=360 bgcolor=#d6d6d6
| 494360 ||  || — || November 17, 2006 || Kitt Peak || Spacewatch || — || align=right | 2.7 km || 
|-id=361 bgcolor=#d6d6d6
| 494361 ||  || — || October 24, 2011 || Haleakala || Pan-STARRS || EOS || align=right | 1.7 km || 
|-id=362 bgcolor=#d6d6d6
| 494362 ||  || — || December 26, 2006 || Kitt Peak || Spacewatch || — || align=right | 2.7 km || 
|-id=363 bgcolor=#fefefe
| 494363 ||  || — || April 4, 2008 || Catalina || CSS || — || align=right | 1.1 km || 
|-id=364 bgcolor=#E9E9E9
| 494364 ||  || — || October 22, 2012 || Haleakala || Pan-STARRS || — || align=right data-sort-value="0.72" | 720 m || 
|-id=365 bgcolor=#d6d6d6
| 494365 ||  || — || March 9, 2008 || Mount Lemmon || Mount Lemmon Survey || EOS || align=right | 1.7 km || 
|-id=366 bgcolor=#fefefe
| 494366 ||  || — || March 10, 2005 || Mount Lemmon || Mount Lemmon Survey || — || align=right data-sort-value="0.65" | 650 m || 
|-id=367 bgcolor=#d6d6d6
| 494367 ||  || — || March 29, 2009 || Kitt Peak || Spacewatch || — || align=right | 1.9 km || 
|-id=368 bgcolor=#E9E9E9
| 494368 ||  || — || November 12, 1999 || Socorro || LINEAR || — || align=right data-sort-value="0.96" | 960 m || 
|-id=369 bgcolor=#fefefe
| 494369 ||  || — || September 28, 2006 || Mount Lemmon || Mount Lemmon Survey || — || align=right data-sort-value="0.66" | 660 m || 
|-id=370 bgcolor=#E9E9E9
| 494370 ||  || — || October 17, 2003 || Kitt Peak || Spacewatch || — || align=right | 1.5 km || 
|-id=371 bgcolor=#E9E9E9
| 494371 ||  || — || January 1, 2009 || XuYi || PMO NEO || — || align=right | 1.5 km || 
|-id=372 bgcolor=#d6d6d6
| 494372 ||  || — || September 30, 2006 || Mount Lemmon || Mount Lemmon Survey || — || align=right | 2.3 km || 
|-id=373 bgcolor=#d6d6d6
| 494373 ||  || — || March 6, 2008 || Mount Lemmon || Mount Lemmon Survey || — || align=right | 3.8 km || 
|-id=374 bgcolor=#d6d6d6
| 494374 ||  || — || December 27, 2006 || Mount Lemmon || Mount Lemmon Survey || — || align=right | 2.4 km || 
|-id=375 bgcolor=#d6d6d6
| 494375 ||  || — || September 15, 2010 || Mount Lemmon || Mount Lemmon Survey || — || align=right | 3.0 km || 
|-id=376 bgcolor=#d6d6d6
| 494376 ||  || — || September 29, 2005 || Kitt Peak || Spacewatch || — || align=right | 3.3 km || 
|-id=377 bgcolor=#E9E9E9
| 494377 ||  || — || December 29, 2008 || Mount Lemmon || Mount Lemmon Survey || — || align=right | 1.3 km || 
|-id=378 bgcolor=#E9E9E9
| 494378 ||  || — || October 18, 2006 || Kitt Peak || Spacewatch || — || align=right | 2.2 km || 
|-id=379 bgcolor=#fefefe
| 494379 ||  || — || October 26, 2009 || Kitt Peak || Spacewatch || — || align=right data-sort-value="0.82" | 820 m || 
|-id=380 bgcolor=#d6d6d6
| 494380 ||  || — || September 10, 2010 || Mount Lemmon || Mount Lemmon Survey || — || align=right | 2.7 km || 
|-id=381 bgcolor=#fefefe
| 494381 ||  || — || December 12, 1998 || Kitt Peak || Spacewatch || — || align=right data-sort-value="0.65" | 650 m || 
|-id=382 bgcolor=#d6d6d6
| 494382 ||  || — || November 6, 2005 || Mount Lemmon || Mount Lemmon Survey || — || align=right | 2.6 km || 
|-id=383 bgcolor=#fefefe
| 494383 ||  || — || October 20, 2006 || Kitt Peak || Spacewatch || — || align=right data-sort-value="0.79" | 790 m || 
|-id=384 bgcolor=#d6d6d6
| 494384 ||  || — || August 31, 2005 || Kitt Peak || Spacewatch || EOS || align=right | 1.5 km || 
|-id=385 bgcolor=#d6d6d6
| 494385 ||  || — || November 19, 2006 || Kitt Peak || Spacewatch || — || align=right | 3.1 km || 
|-id=386 bgcolor=#d6d6d6
| 494386 ||  || — || October 13, 2005 || Kitt Peak || Spacewatch || — || align=right | 2.6 km || 
|-id=387 bgcolor=#d6d6d6
| 494387 ||  || — || September 27, 2005 || Kitt Peak || Spacewatch || — || align=right | 2.1 km || 
|-id=388 bgcolor=#fefefe
| 494388 ||  || — || November 8, 2009 || Mount Lemmon || Mount Lemmon Survey || — || align=right data-sort-value="0.70" | 700 m || 
|-id=389 bgcolor=#E9E9E9
| 494389 ||  || — || December 16, 1995 || Kitt Peak || Spacewatch || critical || align=right | 1.2 km || 
|-id=390 bgcolor=#d6d6d6
| 494390 ||  || — || October 30, 2011 || Mount Lemmon || Mount Lemmon Survey || — || align=right | 2.4 km || 
|-id=391 bgcolor=#E9E9E9
| 494391 ||  || — || April 5, 2014 || Haleakala || Pan-STARRS || ADE || align=right | 1.5 km || 
|-id=392 bgcolor=#E9E9E9
| 494392 ||  || — || May 12, 2010 || Kitt Peak || Spacewatch || (5) || align=right data-sort-value="0.86" | 860 m || 
|-id=393 bgcolor=#E9E9E9
| 494393 ||  || — || May 13, 2005 || Mount Lemmon || Mount Lemmon Survey || — || align=right | 2.6 km || 
|-id=394 bgcolor=#fefefe
| 494394 ||  || — || September 17, 2006 || Kitt Peak || Spacewatch || — || align=right data-sort-value="0.47" | 470 m || 
|-id=395 bgcolor=#fefefe
| 494395 ||  || — || August 21, 2004 || Siding Spring || SSS || — || align=right data-sort-value="0.90" | 900 m || 
|-id=396 bgcolor=#d6d6d6
| 494396 ||  || — || December 18, 2007 || Mount Lemmon || Mount Lemmon Survey || — || align=right | 2.2 km || 
|-id=397 bgcolor=#E9E9E9
| 494397 ||  || — || August 20, 2011 || Haleakala || Pan-STARRS || — || align=right | 1.9 km || 
|-id=398 bgcolor=#E9E9E9
| 494398 ||  || — || September 12, 1994 || Kitt Peak || Spacewatch || — || align=right | 1.6 km || 
|-id=399 bgcolor=#d6d6d6
| 494399 ||  || — || March 1, 2008 || Kitt Peak || Spacewatch || EOS || align=right | 1.8 km || 
|-id=400 bgcolor=#d6d6d6
| 494400 ||  || — || April 11, 2008 || Mount Lemmon || Mount Lemmon Survey || — || align=right | 2.5 km || 
|}

494401–494500 

|-bgcolor=#fefefe
| 494401 ||  || — || September 30, 2009 || Mount Lemmon || Mount Lemmon Survey || V || align=right data-sort-value="0.62" | 620 m || 
|-id=402 bgcolor=#d6d6d6
| 494402 ||  || — || July 5, 2005 || Kitt Peak || Spacewatch || EOS || align=right | 1.7 km || 
|-id=403 bgcolor=#d6d6d6
| 494403 ||  || — || December 26, 2011 || Mount Lemmon || Mount Lemmon Survey || EOS || align=right | 2.5 km || 
|-id=404 bgcolor=#d6d6d6
| 494404 ||  || — || November 12, 2005 || Kitt Peak || Spacewatch || URS || align=right | 3.3 km || 
|-id=405 bgcolor=#E9E9E9
| 494405 ||  || — || November 6, 2008 || Kitt Peak || Spacewatch || (5) || align=right data-sort-value="0.89" | 890 m || 
|-id=406 bgcolor=#d6d6d6
| 494406 ||  || — || October 10, 2005 || Kitt Peak || Spacewatch || EOS || align=right | 2.4 km || 
|-id=407 bgcolor=#fefefe
| 494407 ||  || — || November 26, 2009 || Mount Lemmon || Mount Lemmon Survey || — || align=right data-sort-value="0.90" | 900 m || 
|-id=408 bgcolor=#d6d6d6
| 494408 ||  || — || October 22, 2005 || Catalina || CSS || — || align=right | 3.0 km || 
|-id=409 bgcolor=#fefefe
| 494409 ||  || — || April 19, 2007 || Mount Lemmon || Mount Lemmon Survey || — || align=right data-sort-value="0.90" | 900 m || 
|-id=410 bgcolor=#fefefe
| 494410 ||  || — || March 26, 2011 || Mount Lemmon || Mount Lemmon Survey || — || align=right data-sort-value="0.84" | 840 m || 
|-id=411 bgcolor=#E9E9E9
| 494411 ||  || — || October 22, 2012 || Haleakala || Pan-STARRS || MAR || align=right data-sort-value="0.97" | 970 m || 
|-id=412 bgcolor=#E9E9E9
| 494412 ||  || — || September 28, 2003 || Kitt Peak || Spacewatch || — || align=right | 1.3 km || 
|-id=413 bgcolor=#d6d6d6
| 494413 ||  || — || September 23, 2005 || Kitt Peak || Spacewatch || — || align=right | 2.4 km || 
|-id=414 bgcolor=#fefefe
| 494414 ||  || — || December 25, 2005 || Kitt Peak || Spacewatch || MAS || align=right data-sort-value="0.55" | 550 m || 
|-id=415 bgcolor=#d6d6d6
| 494415 ||  || — || October 18, 2011 || Mount Lemmon || Mount Lemmon Survey || — || align=right | 2.1 km || 
|-id=416 bgcolor=#E9E9E9
| 494416 ||  || — || April 10, 2010 || Mount Lemmon || Mount Lemmon Survey || DOR || align=right | 2.2 km || 
|-id=417 bgcolor=#d6d6d6
| 494417 ||  || — || November 28, 2011 || Mount Lemmon || Mount Lemmon Survey || — || align=right | 2.4 km || 
|-id=418 bgcolor=#d6d6d6
| 494418 ||  || — || October 30, 2011 || Kitt Peak || Spacewatch || — || align=right | 2.3 km || 
|-id=419 bgcolor=#E9E9E9
| 494419 ||  || — || May 22, 2011 || Mount Lemmon || Mount Lemmon Survey || — || align=right data-sort-value="0.78" | 780 m || 
|-id=420 bgcolor=#fefefe
| 494420 ||  || — || December 10, 2005 || Kitt Peak || Spacewatch || — || align=right data-sort-value="0.70" | 700 m || 
|-id=421 bgcolor=#d6d6d6
| 494421 ||  || — || September 30, 2005 || Mount Lemmon || Mount Lemmon Survey || EOS || align=right | 3.1 km || 
|-id=422 bgcolor=#fefefe
| 494422 ||  || — || September 20, 2001 || Socorro || LINEAR || — || align=right data-sort-value="0.60" | 600 m || 
|-id=423 bgcolor=#d6d6d6
| 494423 ||  || — || September 30, 2005 || Kitt Peak || Spacewatch || — || align=right | 2.3 km || 
|-id=424 bgcolor=#d6d6d6
| 494424 ||  || — || September 17, 2006 || Kitt Peak || Spacewatch || — || align=right | 2.1 km || 
|-id=425 bgcolor=#E9E9E9
| 494425 ||  || — || November 18, 2003 || Kitt Peak || Spacewatch || EUN || align=right data-sort-value="0.90" | 900 m || 
|-id=426 bgcolor=#E9E9E9
| 494426 ||  || — || February 13, 2004 || Kitt Peak || Spacewatch || — || align=right | 2.0 km || 
|-id=427 bgcolor=#fefefe
| 494427 ||  || — || October 18, 2009 || Mount Lemmon || Mount Lemmon Survey || — || align=right data-sort-value="0.54" | 540 m || 
|-id=428 bgcolor=#E9E9E9
| 494428 ||  || — || November 7, 2012 || Kitt Peak || Spacewatch || (5) || align=right data-sort-value="0.70" | 700 m || 
|-id=429 bgcolor=#E9E9E9
| 494429 ||  || — || October 17, 2007 || Mount Lemmon || Mount Lemmon Survey || — || align=right | 1.9 km || 
|-id=430 bgcolor=#d6d6d6
| 494430 ||  || — || October 11, 2005 || Kitt Peak || Spacewatch || — || align=right | 2.2 km || 
|-id=431 bgcolor=#E9E9E9
| 494431 ||  || — || October 20, 2003 || Kitt Peak || Spacewatch || EUN || align=right | 1.0 km || 
|-id=432 bgcolor=#fefefe
| 494432 ||  || — || April 3, 2008 || Mount Lemmon || Mount Lemmon Survey || V || align=right data-sort-value="0.49" | 490 m || 
|-id=433 bgcolor=#d6d6d6
| 494433 ||  || — || September 15, 2010 || Mount Lemmon || Mount Lemmon Survey || EOS || align=right | 2.4 km || 
|-id=434 bgcolor=#d6d6d6
| 494434 ||  || — || April 20, 2009 || Mount Lemmon || Mount Lemmon Survey || EOS || align=right | 2.2 km || 
|-id=435 bgcolor=#d6d6d6
| 494435 ||  || — || April 18, 2009 || Mount Lemmon || Mount Lemmon Survey || — || align=right | 2.5 km || 
|-id=436 bgcolor=#d6d6d6
| 494436 ||  || — || September 29, 1994 || Kitt Peak || Spacewatch || — || align=right | 2.0 km || 
|-id=437 bgcolor=#d6d6d6
| 494437 ||  || — || October 20, 2011 || Mount Lemmon || Mount Lemmon Survey || — || align=right | 2.2 km || 
|-id=438 bgcolor=#E9E9E9
| 494438 ||  || — || September 28, 2003 || Kitt Peak || Spacewatch || — || align=right | 1.7 km || 
|-id=439 bgcolor=#fefefe
| 494439 ||  || — || August 31, 2005 || Kitt Peak || Spacewatch || — || align=right data-sort-value="0.78" | 780 m || 
|-id=440 bgcolor=#E9E9E9
| 494440 ||  || — || January 1, 2009 || Kitt Peak || Spacewatch || — || align=right | 1.3 km || 
|-id=441 bgcolor=#fefefe
| 494441 ||  || — || June 29, 2005 || Kitt Peak || Spacewatch || NYS || align=right data-sort-value="0.55" | 550 m || 
|-id=442 bgcolor=#fefefe
| 494442 ||  || — || March 11, 2007 || Mount Lemmon || Mount Lemmon Survey || NYS || align=right data-sort-value="0.79" | 790 m || 
|-id=443 bgcolor=#d6d6d6
| 494443 ||  || — || November 15, 2011 || Mount Lemmon || Mount Lemmon Survey || EOS || align=right | 1.5 km || 
|-id=444 bgcolor=#E9E9E9
| 494444 ||  || — || June 7, 2011 || Kitt Peak || Spacewatch || — || align=right | 1.3 km || 
|-id=445 bgcolor=#d6d6d6
| 494445 ||  || — || March 12, 2008 || Mount Lemmon || Mount Lemmon Survey || — || align=right | 3.2 km || 
|-id=446 bgcolor=#d6d6d6
| 494446 ||  || — || January 17, 2007 || Kitt Peak || Spacewatch || THM || align=right | 1.8 km || 
|-id=447 bgcolor=#E9E9E9
| 494447 ||  || — || October 8, 2012 || Mount Lemmon || Mount Lemmon Survey || — || align=right data-sort-value="0.70" | 700 m || 
|-id=448 bgcolor=#d6d6d6
| 494448 ||  || — || September 16, 2010 || Mount Lemmon || Mount Lemmon Survey || — || align=right | 2.7 km || 
|-id=449 bgcolor=#d6d6d6
| 494449 ||  || — || June 25, 2010 || WISE || WISE || — || align=right | 2.8 km || 
|-id=450 bgcolor=#E9E9E9
| 494450 ||  || — || September 6, 1997 || Caussols || ODAS || HNA || align=right | 1.5 km || 
|-id=451 bgcolor=#d6d6d6
| 494451 ||  || — || November 2, 2005 || Mount Lemmon || Mount Lemmon Survey || — || align=right | 2.9 km || 
|-id=452 bgcolor=#fefefe
| 494452 ||  || — || February 19, 2012 || Catalina || CSS || H || align=right data-sort-value="0.57" | 570 m || 
|-id=453 bgcolor=#d6d6d6
| 494453 ||  || — || September 15, 2010 || Mount Lemmon || Mount Lemmon Survey || VER  EOS || align=right | 2.4 km || 
|-id=454 bgcolor=#d6d6d6
| 494454 ||  || — || December 17, 2007 || Mount Lemmon || Mount Lemmon Survey || — || align=right | 2.9 km || 
|-id=455 bgcolor=#E9E9E9
| 494455 ||  || — || October 24, 2007 || Mount Lemmon || Mount Lemmon Survey || AGN || align=right | 1.2 km || 
|-id=456 bgcolor=#d6d6d6
| 494456 ||  || — || December 11, 2006 || Kitt Peak || Spacewatch || EOS || align=right | 1.7 km || 
|-id=457 bgcolor=#fefefe
| 494457 ||  || — || April 29, 2003 || Kitt Peak || Spacewatch || — || align=right data-sort-value="0.89" | 890 m || 
|-id=458 bgcolor=#d6d6d6
| 494458 ||  || — || October 12, 2005 || Kitt Peak || Spacewatch || — || align=right | 3.1 km || 
|-id=459 bgcolor=#E9E9E9
| 494459 ||  || — || October 21, 2003 || Kitt Peak || Spacewatch || — || align=right | 1.1 km || 
|-id=460 bgcolor=#d6d6d6
| 494460 ||  || — || November 24, 2011 || Mount Lemmon || Mount Lemmon Survey || EOS || align=right | 1.9 km || 
|-id=461 bgcolor=#E9E9E9
| 494461 ||  || — || December 4, 2008 || Kitt Peak || Spacewatch || — || align=right data-sort-value="0.75" | 750 m || 
|-id=462 bgcolor=#E9E9E9
| 494462 ||  || — || September 20, 1995 || Kitt Peak || Spacewatch || — || align=right data-sort-value="0.94" | 940 m || 
|-id=463 bgcolor=#E9E9E9
| 494463 ||  || — || October 15, 2012 || Mount Lemmon || Mount Lemmon Survey || EUN || align=right | 1.2 km || 
|-id=464 bgcolor=#E9E9E9
| 494464 ||  || — || November 6, 2012 || Mount Lemmon || Mount Lemmon Survey || EUN || align=right | 1.1 km || 
|-id=465 bgcolor=#fefefe
| 494465 ||  || — || April 2, 2005 || Mount Lemmon || Mount Lemmon Survey || — || align=right data-sort-value="0.86" | 860 m || 
|-id=466 bgcolor=#fefefe
| 494466 ||  || — || September 29, 1994 || Kitt Peak || Spacewatch || — || align=right data-sort-value="0.65" | 650 m || 
|-id=467 bgcolor=#E9E9E9
| 494467 ||  || — || April 3, 2009 || Mount Lemmon || Mount Lemmon Survey || HOF || align=right | 2.0 km || 
|-id=468 bgcolor=#fefefe
| 494468 ||  || — || March 8, 2005 || Mount Lemmon || Mount Lemmon Survey || — || align=right data-sort-value="0.65" | 650 m || 
|-id=469 bgcolor=#d6d6d6
| 494469 ||  || — || November 22, 2005 || Kitt Peak || Spacewatch || THM || align=right | 1.8 km || 
|-id=470 bgcolor=#d6d6d6
| 494470 ||  || — || September 19, 2006 || Catalina || CSS || — || align=right | 3.5 km || 
|-id=471 bgcolor=#fefefe
| 494471 ||  || — || October 24, 2009 || Kitt Peak || Spacewatch || — || align=right data-sort-value="0.70" | 700 m || 
|-id=472 bgcolor=#fefefe
| 494472 ||  || — || October 3, 1997 || Caussols || ODAS || — || align=right data-sort-value="0.75" | 750 m || 
|-id=473 bgcolor=#fefefe
| 494473 ||  || — || November 17, 2006 || Kitt Peak || Spacewatch || — || align=right data-sort-value="0.73" | 730 m || 
|-id=474 bgcolor=#E9E9E9
| 494474 ||  || — || October 25, 2008 || Kitt Peak || Spacewatch || — || align=right | 1.2 km || 
|-id=475 bgcolor=#d6d6d6
| 494475 ||  || — || October 21, 2011 || Mount Lemmon || Mount Lemmon Survey || — || align=right | 2.2 km || 
|-id=476 bgcolor=#E9E9E9
| 494476 ||  || — || October 18, 2007 || Mount Lemmon || Mount Lemmon Survey || — || align=right | 1.2 km || 
|-id=477 bgcolor=#d6d6d6
| 494477 ||  || — || July 5, 2010 || Kitt Peak || Spacewatch || — || align=right | 2.8 km || 
|-id=478 bgcolor=#E9E9E9
| 494478 ||  || — || November 19, 2003 || Kitt Peak || Spacewatch || — || align=right | 1.3 km || 
|-id=479 bgcolor=#fefefe
| 494479 ||  || — || November 12, 2009 || La Sagra || OAM Obs. || — || align=right data-sort-value="0.74" | 740 m || 
|-id=480 bgcolor=#fefefe
| 494480 ||  || — || February 4, 2010 || WISE || WISE || — || align=right | 1.3 km || 
|-id=481 bgcolor=#fefefe
| 494481 ||  || — || November 25, 2009 || Kitt Peak || Spacewatch || — || align=right data-sort-value="0.66" | 660 m || 
|-id=482 bgcolor=#d6d6d6
| 494482 ||  || — || September 18, 2010 || Mount Lemmon || Mount Lemmon Survey || EOS || align=right | 2.1 km || 
|-id=483 bgcolor=#E9E9E9
| 494483 ||  || — || January 17, 2013 || Mount Lemmon || Mount Lemmon Survey || EUN || align=right | 1.1 km || 
|-id=484 bgcolor=#d6d6d6
| 494484 ||  || — || May 22, 2010 || WISE || WISE || EUP || align=right | 2.6 km || 
|-id=485 bgcolor=#d6d6d6
| 494485 ||  || — || August 28, 2005 || Kitt Peak || Spacewatch || — || align=right | 3.1 km || 
|-id=486 bgcolor=#d6d6d6
| 494486 ||  || — || April 5, 2014 || Haleakala || Pan-STARRS || — || align=right | 2.4 km || 
|-id=487 bgcolor=#d6d6d6
| 494487 ||  || — || July 21, 2010 || WISE || WISE || — || align=right | 2.7 km || 
|-id=488 bgcolor=#E9E9E9
| 494488 ||  || — || November 5, 2012 || Kitt Peak || Spacewatch || — || align=right data-sort-value="0.83" | 830 m || 
|-id=489 bgcolor=#E9E9E9
| 494489 ||  || — || September 10, 2007 || Mount Lemmon || Mount Lemmon Survey || — || align=right | 1.5 km || 
|-id=490 bgcolor=#E9E9E9
| 494490 ||  || — || December 22, 1998 || Kitt Peak || Spacewatch || WIT || align=right | 2.9 km || 
|-id=491 bgcolor=#E9E9E9
| 494491 ||  || — || March 17, 2005 || Mount Lemmon || Mount Lemmon Survey || AGN || align=right | 1.5 km || 
|-id=492 bgcolor=#d6d6d6
| 494492 ||  || — || September 30, 2011 || Kitt Peak || Spacewatch || — || align=right | 2.2 km || 
|-id=493 bgcolor=#E9E9E9
| 494493 ||  || — || January 3, 2013 || Catalina || CSS || — || align=right | 1.5 km || 
|-id=494 bgcolor=#d6d6d6
| 494494 ||  || — || October 27, 2006 || Mount Lemmon || Mount Lemmon Survey || NAE || align=right | 3.0 km || 
|-id=495 bgcolor=#E9E9E9
| 494495 ||  || — || December 8, 2012 || Catalina || CSS || — || align=right data-sort-value="0.92" | 920 m || 
|-id=496 bgcolor=#E9E9E9
| 494496 ||  || — || November 5, 2007 || Kitt Peak || Spacewatch || — || align=right | 2.2 km || 
|-id=497 bgcolor=#E9E9E9
| 494497 ||  || — || November 8, 2008 || Mount Lemmon || Mount Lemmon Survey || (5) || align=right data-sort-value="0.98" | 980 m || 
|-id=498 bgcolor=#d6d6d6
| 494498 ||  || — || October 5, 2005 || Kitt Peak || Spacewatch || EOS || align=right | 2.7 km || 
|-id=499 bgcolor=#fefefe
| 494499 ||  || — || October 29, 2005 || Mount Lemmon || Mount Lemmon Survey || — || align=right data-sort-value="0.70" | 700 m || 
|-id=500 bgcolor=#E9E9E9
| 494500 ||  || — || October 29, 2003 || Kitt Peak || Spacewatch || MIS || align=right | 1.0 km || 
|}

494501–494600 

|-bgcolor=#d6d6d6
| 494501 ||  || — || January 12, 2008 || Kitt Peak || Spacewatch || — || align=right | 2.2 km || 
|-id=502 bgcolor=#E9E9E9
| 494502 ||  || — || December 6, 2012 || Mount Lemmon || Mount Lemmon Survey || — || align=right | 1.1 km || 
|-id=503 bgcolor=#fefefe
| 494503 ||  || — || September 15, 2012 || Catalina || CSS || NYS || align=right data-sort-value="0.54" | 540 m || 
|-id=504 bgcolor=#fefefe
| 494504 ||  || — || April 4, 2008 || Kitt Peak || Spacewatch || — || align=right data-sort-value="0.62" | 620 m || 
|-id=505 bgcolor=#E9E9E9
| 494505 ||  || — || July 5, 2011 || Haleakala || Pan-STARRS || — || align=right | 1.5 km || 
|-id=506 bgcolor=#E9E9E9
| 494506 ||  || — || November 23, 2012 || Catalina || CSS || — || align=right | 1.2 km || 
|-id=507 bgcolor=#E9E9E9
| 494507 ||  || — || January 4, 2013 || Mount Lemmon || Mount Lemmon Survey || — || align=right | 1.2 km || 
|-id=508 bgcolor=#fefefe
| 494508 ||  || — || November 30, 2003 || Kitt Peak || Spacewatch || — || align=right data-sort-value="0.65" | 650 m || 
|-id=509 bgcolor=#E9E9E9
| 494509 ||  || — || October 21, 2006 || Kitt Peak || Spacewatch || — || align=right | 2.6 km || 
|-id=510 bgcolor=#d6d6d6
| 494510 ||  || — || December 26, 2011 || Mount Lemmon || Mount Lemmon Survey || — || align=right | 2.6 km || 
|-id=511 bgcolor=#d6d6d6
| 494511 ||  || — || October 25, 2011 || Haleakala || Pan-STARRS || — || align=right | 3.2 km || 
|-id=512 bgcolor=#E9E9E9
| 494512 ||  || — || December 29, 2003 || Anderson Mesa || LONEOS || — || align=right | 1.3 km || 
|-id=513 bgcolor=#fefefe
| 494513 ||  || — || March 3, 2006 || Kitt Peak || Spacewatch || NYS || align=right data-sort-value="0.69" | 690 m || 
|-id=514 bgcolor=#fefefe
| 494514 ||  || — || February 21, 2006 || Catalina || CSS || H || align=right data-sort-value="0.85" | 850 m || 
|-id=515 bgcolor=#d6d6d6
| 494515 ||  || — || January 7, 2000 || Socorro || LINEAR || — || align=right | 4.7 km || 
|-id=516 bgcolor=#fefefe
| 494516 ||  || — || February 2, 2006 || Mount Lemmon || Mount Lemmon Survey || — || align=right | 1.2 km || 
|-id=517 bgcolor=#fefefe
| 494517 ||  || — || August 9, 2008 || La Sagra || OAM Obs. || — || align=right | 1.2 km || 
|-id=518 bgcolor=#fefefe
| 494518 ||  || — || December 28, 2011 || Catalina || CSS || H || align=right data-sort-value="0.82" | 820 m || 
|-id=519 bgcolor=#fefefe
| 494519 ||  || — || January 4, 2003 || Socorro || LINEAR || — || align=right | 1.6 km || 
|-id=520 bgcolor=#E9E9E9
| 494520 ||  || — || October 9, 2008 || Mount Lemmon || Mount Lemmon Survey || — || align=right | 1.1 km || 
|-id=521 bgcolor=#d6d6d6
| 494521 ||  || — || August 17, 2009 || Kitt Peak || Spacewatch || ELF || align=right | 3.7 km || 
|-id=522 bgcolor=#E9E9E9
| 494522 ||  || — || July 16, 2007 || Siding Spring || SSS || — || align=right | 1.6 km || 
|-id=523 bgcolor=#d6d6d6
| 494523 ||  || — || October 15, 2004 || Mount Lemmon || Mount Lemmon Survey || — || align=right | 2.9 km || 
|-id=524 bgcolor=#E9E9E9
| 494524 ||  || — || February 2, 2009 || Mount Lemmon || Mount Lemmon Survey || EUN || align=right | 1.2 km || 
|-id=525 bgcolor=#d6d6d6
| 494525 ||  || — || September 23, 2009 || Mount Lemmon || Mount Lemmon Survey || EUP || align=right | 4.6 km || 
|-id=526 bgcolor=#d6d6d6
| 494526 ||  || — || August 28, 2014 || Haleakala || Pan-STARRS || — || align=right | 3.4 km || 
|-id=527 bgcolor=#fefefe
| 494527 ||  || — || October 10, 2008 || Mount Lemmon || Mount Lemmon Survey || — || align=right data-sort-value="0.98" | 980 m || 
|-id=528 bgcolor=#d6d6d6
| 494528 ||  || — || January 7, 2000 || Socorro || LINEAR || Tj (2.94) || align=right | 3.8 km || 
|-id=529 bgcolor=#fefefe
| 494529 ||  || — || January 8, 2010 || Kitt Peak || Spacewatch || critical || align=right data-sort-value="0.71" | 710 m || 
|-id=530 bgcolor=#E9E9E9
| 494530 ||  || — || February 16, 2004 || Kitt Peak || Spacewatch || HNS || align=right | 2.2 km || 
|-id=531 bgcolor=#fefefe
| 494531 ||  || — || October 1, 2005 || Mount Lemmon || Mount Lemmon Survey || V || align=right data-sort-value="0.62" | 620 m || 
|-id=532 bgcolor=#fefefe
| 494532 ||  || — || October 25, 2005 || Kitt Peak || Spacewatch || — || align=right data-sort-value="0.87" | 870 m || 
|-id=533 bgcolor=#fefefe
| 494533 ||  || — || November 16, 2009 || Mount Lemmon || Mount Lemmon Survey || — || align=right data-sort-value="0.67" | 670 m || 
|-id=534 bgcolor=#fefefe
| 494534 ||  || — || January 7, 2010 || Kitt Peak || Spacewatch || — || align=right data-sort-value="0.86" | 860 m || 
|-id=535 bgcolor=#E9E9E9
| 494535 ||  || — || November 7, 2007 || Mount Lemmon || Mount Lemmon Survey || HNS || align=right | 2.2 km || 
|-id=536 bgcolor=#d6d6d6
| 494536 ||  || — || January 23, 2006 || Kitt Peak || Spacewatch || — || align=right | 3.5 km || 
|-id=537 bgcolor=#E9E9E9
| 494537 ||  || — || May 2, 2009 || Mount Lemmon || Mount Lemmon Survey || — || align=right | 2.8 km || 
|-id=538 bgcolor=#E9E9E9
| 494538 ||  || — || October 15, 2007 || Catalina || CSS || — || align=right | 1.8 km || 
|-id=539 bgcolor=#fefefe
| 494539 ||  || — || December 7, 2005 || Kitt Peak || Spacewatch || — || align=right data-sort-value="0.92" | 920 m || 
|-id=540 bgcolor=#E9E9E9
| 494540 ||  || — || February 1, 2009 || Kitt Peak || Spacewatch || — || align=right data-sort-value="0.90" | 900 m || 
|-id=541 bgcolor=#fefefe
| 494541 ||  || — || March 12, 2007 || Catalina || CSS || — || align=right | 1.1 km || 
|-id=542 bgcolor=#fefefe
| 494542 ||  || — || January 23, 2006 || Kitt Peak || Spacewatch || MAS || align=right data-sort-value="0.51" | 510 m || 
|-id=543 bgcolor=#E9E9E9
| 494543 ||  || — || November 2, 2007 || Kitt Peak || Spacewatch || — || align=right | 1.4 km || 
|-id=544 bgcolor=#fefefe
| 494544 ||  || — || October 7, 2012 || Haleakala || Pan-STARRS || — || align=right data-sort-value="0.73" | 730 m || 
|-id=545 bgcolor=#FA8072
| 494545 ||  || — || October 16, 2007 || Mount Lemmon || Mount Lemmon Survey || — || align=right data-sort-value="0.99" | 990 m || 
|-id=546 bgcolor=#d6d6d6
| 494546 ||  || — || September 7, 2004 || Kitt Peak || Spacewatch || — || align=right | 3.0 km || 
|-id=547 bgcolor=#d6d6d6
| 494547 ||  || — || April 21, 2012 || Haleakala || Pan-STARRS || — || align=right | 3.5 km || 
|-id=548 bgcolor=#fefefe
| 494548 ||  || — || January 5, 2006 || Mount Lemmon || Mount Lemmon Survey || — || align=right data-sort-value="0.97" | 970 m || 
|-id=549 bgcolor=#fefefe
| 494549 ||  || — || December 14, 1999 || Socorro || LINEAR || H || align=right data-sort-value="0.99" | 990 m || 
|-id=550 bgcolor=#fefefe
| 494550 ||  || — || March 14, 2012 || Haleakala || Pan-STARRS || H || align=right data-sort-value="0.76" | 760 m || 
|-id=551 bgcolor=#E9E9E9
| 494551 ||  || — || August 27, 2006 || Kitt Peak || Spacewatch || — || align=right | 2.6 km || 
|-id=552 bgcolor=#d6d6d6
| 494552 ||  || — || January 28, 2006 || Catalina || CSS || EUP || align=right | 4.4 km || 
|-id=553 bgcolor=#E9E9E9
| 494553 ||  || — || July 25, 2015 || Haleakala || Pan-STARRS || JUN || align=right data-sort-value="0.94" | 940 m || 
|-id=554 bgcolor=#d6d6d6
| 494554 ||  || — || December 14, 2004 || Socorro || LINEAR || — || align=right | 3.2 km || 
|-id=555 bgcolor=#fefefe
| 494555 ||  || — || October 25, 2005 || Kitt Peak || Spacewatch || — || align=right data-sort-value="0.98" | 980 m || 
|-id=556 bgcolor=#fefefe
| 494556 ||  || — || March 16, 2004 || Kitt Peak || Spacewatch || — || align=right data-sort-value="0.94" | 940 m || 
|-id=557 bgcolor=#E9E9E9
| 494557 ||  || — || January 31, 2008 || Catalina || CSS || — || align=right | 2.6 km || 
|-id=558 bgcolor=#d6d6d6
| 494558 ||  || — || October 26, 2009 || Kitt Peak || Spacewatch || — || align=right | 4.2 km || 
|-id=559 bgcolor=#fefefe
| 494559 ||  || — || March 15, 2007 || Catalina || CSS || — || align=right data-sort-value="0.95" | 950 m || 
|-id=560 bgcolor=#E9E9E9
| 494560 ||  || — || November 2, 2011 || Mount Lemmon || Mount Lemmon Survey || — || align=right | 2.3 km || 
|-id=561 bgcolor=#d6d6d6
| 494561 ||  || — || September 17, 2009 || Mount Lemmon || Mount Lemmon Survey || — || align=right | 3.0 km || 
|-id=562 bgcolor=#E9E9E9
| 494562 ||  || — || January 28, 2004 || Socorro || LINEAR || JUN || align=right | 1.1 km || 
|-id=563 bgcolor=#E9E9E9
| 494563 ||  || — || March 5, 2013 || Haleakala || Pan-STARRS || — || align=right | 2.3 km || 
|-id=564 bgcolor=#fefefe
| 494564 ||  || — || May 1, 2003 || Kitt Peak || Spacewatch || — || align=right data-sort-value="0.90" | 900 m || 
|-id=565 bgcolor=#d6d6d6
| 494565 ||  || — || December 15, 2004 || Kitt Peak || Spacewatch || THM || align=right | 3.1 km || 
|-id=566 bgcolor=#E9E9E9
| 494566 ||  || — || January 26, 2003 || Kitt Peak || Spacewatch || — || align=right | 3.4 km || 
|-id=567 bgcolor=#E9E9E9
| 494567 ||  || — || August 29, 2006 || Catalina || CSS || — || align=right | 1.9 km || 
|-id=568 bgcolor=#fefefe
| 494568 ||  || — || March 6, 2003 || Anderson Mesa || LONEOS || — || align=right data-sort-value="0.67" | 670 m || 
|-id=569 bgcolor=#E9E9E9
| 494569 ||  || — || September 13, 2007 || Kitt Peak || Spacewatch || (5) || align=right data-sort-value="0.78" | 780 m || 
|-id=570 bgcolor=#E9E9E9
| 494570 ||  || — || November 20, 2007 || Mount Lemmon || Mount Lemmon Survey || KON || align=right | 2.4 km || 
|-id=571 bgcolor=#fefefe
| 494571 ||  || — || January 22, 2006 || Mount Lemmon || Mount Lemmon Survey || — || align=right data-sort-value="0.93" | 930 m || 
|-id=572 bgcolor=#d6d6d6
| 494572 ||  || — || February 27, 2006 || Mount Lemmon || Mount Lemmon Survey || Tj (2.92) || align=right | 4.5 km || 
|-id=573 bgcolor=#E9E9E9
| 494573 ||  || — || August 28, 2011 || Haleakala || Pan-STARRS || — || align=right | 1.1 km || 
|-id=574 bgcolor=#fefefe
| 494574 ||  || — || February 2, 2006 || Kitt Peak || Spacewatch || — || align=right | 1.5 km || 
|-id=575 bgcolor=#d6d6d6
| 494575 ||  || — || February 29, 2008 || Kitt Peak || Spacewatch || KOR  KAR || align=right | 1.6 km || 
|-id=576 bgcolor=#fefefe
| 494576 ||  || — || January 28, 2006 || Kitt Peak || Spacewatch || NYS || align=right data-sort-value="0.61" | 610 m || 
|-id=577 bgcolor=#d6d6d6
| 494577 ||  || — || November 3, 2011 || Catalina || CSS || — || align=right | 3.4 km || 
|-id=578 bgcolor=#fefefe
| 494578 ||  || — || December 19, 2009 || Mount Lemmon || Mount Lemmon Survey || — || align=right data-sort-value="0.82" | 820 m || 
|-id=579 bgcolor=#E9E9E9
| 494579 ||  || — || March 26, 2004 || Kitt Peak || Spacewatch || — || align=right | 2.2 km || 
|-id=580 bgcolor=#fefefe
| 494580 ||  || — || October 7, 2008 || Kitt Peak || Spacewatch || — || align=right data-sort-value="0.64" | 640 m || 
|-id=581 bgcolor=#fefefe
| 494581 ||  || — || January 8, 2007 || Mount Lemmon || Mount Lemmon Survey || — || align=right data-sort-value="0.82" | 820 m || 
|-id=582 bgcolor=#fefefe
| 494582 ||  || — || January 17, 2013 || Haleakala || Pan-STARRS || — || align=right | 1.0 km || 
|-id=583 bgcolor=#fefefe
| 494583 ||  || — || October 3, 2005 || Kitt Peak || Spacewatch || — || align=right data-sort-value="0.82" | 820 m || 
|-id=584 bgcolor=#d6d6d6
| 494584 ||  || — || January 27, 2006 || Catalina || CSS || — || align=right | 3.3 km || 
|-id=585 bgcolor=#fefefe
| 494585 ||  || — || November 30, 2005 || Mount Lemmon || Mount Lemmon Survey || V || align=right data-sort-value="0.74" | 740 m || 
|-id=586 bgcolor=#fefefe
| 494586 ||  || — || October 27, 2005 || Kitt Peak || Spacewatch || — || align=right data-sort-value="0.59" | 590 m || 
|-id=587 bgcolor=#E9E9E9
| 494587 ||  || — || November 17, 2011 || Mount Lemmon || Mount Lemmon Survey || — || align=right | 2.7 km || 
|-id=588 bgcolor=#E9E9E9
| 494588 ||  || — || August 21, 2006 || Kitt Peak || Spacewatch || — || align=right | 2.3 km || 
|-id=589 bgcolor=#fefefe
| 494589 ||  || — || February 2, 2006 || Mount Lemmon || Mount Lemmon Survey || — || align=right data-sort-value="0.87" | 870 m || 
|-id=590 bgcolor=#fefefe
| 494590 ||  || — || February 18, 2010 || Mount Lemmon || Mount Lemmon Survey || — || align=right data-sort-value="0.72" | 720 m || 
|-id=591 bgcolor=#E9E9E9
| 494591 ||  || — || September 18, 2003 || Kitt Peak || Spacewatch || — || align=right | 1.1 km || 
|-id=592 bgcolor=#d6d6d6
| 494592 ||  || — || July 30, 2008 || Kitt Peak || Spacewatch || — || align=right | 3.8 km || 
|-id=593 bgcolor=#fefefe
| 494593 ||  || — || October 31, 2008 || Mount Lemmon || Mount Lemmon Survey || — || align=right data-sort-value="0.81" | 810 m || 
|-id=594 bgcolor=#d6d6d6
| 494594 ||  || — || April 4, 2008 || Mount Lemmon || Mount Lemmon Survey || BRA || align=right | 1.6 km || 
|-id=595 bgcolor=#E9E9E9
| 494595 ||  || — || July 28, 2011 || Siding Spring || SSS || — || align=right | 1.3 km || 
|-id=596 bgcolor=#fefefe
| 494596 ||  || — || October 3, 2008 || Mount Lemmon || Mount Lemmon Survey || — || align=right data-sort-value="0.98" | 980 m || 
|-id=597 bgcolor=#d6d6d6
| 494597 ||  || — || March 13, 2007 || Mount Lemmon || Mount Lemmon Survey || — || align=right | 2.5 km || 
|-id=598 bgcolor=#d6d6d6
| 494598 ||  || — || December 5, 2005 || Mount Lemmon || Mount Lemmon Survey || — || align=right | 4.2 km || 
|-id=599 bgcolor=#E9E9E9
| 494599 ||  || — || September 5, 2010 || Mount Lemmon || Mount Lemmon Survey || EUN || align=right | 1.5 km || 
|-id=600 bgcolor=#d6d6d6
| 494600 ||  || — || December 26, 2011 || Mount Lemmon || Mount Lemmon Survey || — || align=right | 1.9 km || 
|}

494601–494700 

|-bgcolor=#E9E9E9
| 494601 ||  || — || December 30, 2008 || Kitt Peak || Spacewatch || — || align=right data-sort-value="0.88" | 880 m || 
|-id=602 bgcolor=#E9E9E9
| 494602 ||  || — || October 4, 2006 || Mount Lemmon || Mount Lemmon Survey || — || align=right | 2.5 km || 
|-id=603 bgcolor=#E9E9E9
| 494603 ||  || — || February 13, 2009 || Catalina || CSS || MAR || align=right | 1.3 km || 
|-id=604 bgcolor=#fefefe
| 494604 ||  || — || December 15, 2004 || Kitt Peak || Spacewatch || — || align=right data-sort-value="0.95" | 950 m || 
|-id=605 bgcolor=#d6d6d6
| 494605 ||  || — || October 8, 2008 || Mount Lemmon || Mount Lemmon Survey || — || align=right | 3.6 km || 
|-id=606 bgcolor=#E9E9E9
| 494606 ||  || — || December 31, 1999 || Kitt Peak || Spacewatch || HNS || align=right | 2.6 km || 
|-id=607 bgcolor=#E9E9E9
| 494607 ||  || — || December 18, 2007 || Mount Lemmon || Mount Lemmon Survey || — || align=right | 1.6 km || 
|-id=608 bgcolor=#d6d6d6
| 494608 ||  || — || September 11, 2004 || Kitt Peak || Spacewatch || — || align=right | 2.8 km || 
|-id=609 bgcolor=#E9E9E9
| 494609 ||  || — || November 11, 2007 || Mount Lemmon || Mount Lemmon Survey || — || align=right | 1.8 km || 
|-id=610 bgcolor=#d6d6d6
| 494610 ||  || — || April 20, 2007 || Kitt Peak || Spacewatch || — || align=right | 2.9 km || 
|-id=611 bgcolor=#E9E9E9
| 494611 ||  || — || August 31, 1998 || Kitt Peak || Spacewatch || JUN || align=right data-sort-value="0.80" | 800 m || 
|-id=612 bgcolor=#d6d6d6
| 494612 ||  || — || October 10, 1996 || Kitt Peak || Spacewatch || YAK || align=right | 2.3 km || 
|-id=613 bgcolor=#E9E9E9
| 494613 ||  || — || October 23, 2006 || Mount Lemmon || Mount Lemmon Survey || HOF || align=right | 2.3 km || 
|-id=614 bgcolor=#E9E9E9
| 494614 ||  || — || August 27, 2011 || Haleakala || Pan-STARRS || — || align=right data-sort-value="0.86" | 860 m || 
|-id=615 bgcolor=#d6d6d6
| 494615 ||  || — || June 19, 2013 || Haleakala || Pan-STARRS || ARM || align=right | 3.1 km || 
|-id=616 bgcolor=#d6d6d6
| 494616 ||  || — || March 10, 2007 || Kitt Peak || Spacewatch || — || align=right | 2.4 km || 
|-id=617 bgcolor=#fefefe
| 494617 ||  || — || November 2, 2008 || Mount Lemmon || Mount Lemmon Survey || V || align=right data-sort-value="0.58" | 580 m || 
|-id=618 bgcolor=#fefefe
| 494618 ||  || — || February 1, 2009 || Catalina || CSS || H || align=right data-sort-value="0.62" | 620 m || 
|-id=619 bgcolor=#fefefe
| 494619 ||  || — || December 6, 2005 || Mount Lemmon || Mount Lemmon Survey || — || align=right | 1.1 km || 
|-id=620 bgcolor=#fefefe
| 494620 ||  || — || January 22, 2004 || Socorro || LINEAR || — || align=right data-sort-value="0.71" | 710 m || 
|-id=621 bgcolor=#d6d6d6
| 494621 ||  || — || November 12, 2010 || Mount Lemmon || Mount Lemmon Survey || — || align=right | 2.8 km || 
|-id=622 bgcolor=#E9E9E9
| 494622 ||  || — || January 30, 2004 || Anderson Mesa || LONEOS || — || align=right | 1.6 km || 
|-id=623 bgcolor=#fefefe
| 494623 ||  || — || May 7, 2006 || Kitt Peak || Spacewatch || — || align=right | 1.1 km || 
|-id=624 bgcolor=#E9E9E9
| 494624 ||  || — || February 9, 2008 || Mount Lemmon || Mount Lemmon Survey || — || align=right | 2.3 km || 
|-id=625 bgcolor=#d6d6d6
| 494625 ||  || — || December 25, 2005 || Kitt Peak || Spacewatch || — || align=right | 2.3 km || 
|-id=626 bgcolor=#d6d6d6
| 494626 ||  || — || July 25, 2015 || Haleakala || Pan-STARRS || — || align=right | 2.5 km || 
|-id=627 bgcolor=#E9E9E9
| 494627 ||  || — || January 19, 2013 || Mount Lemmon || Mount Lemmon Survey || EUN || align=right data-sort-value="0.83" | 830 m || 
|-id=628 bgcolor=#d6d6d6
| 494628 ||  || — || September 28, 2008 || Mount Lemmon || Mount Lemmon Survey || — || align=right | 3.2 km || 
|-id=629 bgcolor=#fefefe
| 494629 ||  || — || February 2, 2006 || Kitt Peak || Spacewatch || — || align=right data-sort-value="0.85" | 850 m || 
|-id=630 bgcolor=#fefefe
| 494630 ||  || — || January 17, 2007 || Kitt Peak || Spacewatch || — || align=right data-sort-value="0.52" | 520 m || 
|-id=631 bgcolor=#E9E9E9
| 494631 ||  || — || October 10, 2007 || Mount Lemmon || Mount Lemmon Survey || — || align=right data-sort-value="0.90" | 900 m || 
|-id=632 bgcolor=#fefefe
| 494632 ||  || — || March 26, 2007 || Mount Lemmon || Mount Lemmon Survey || — || align=right data-sort-value="0.78" | 780 m || 
|-id=633 bgcolor=#E9E9E9
| 494633 ||  || — || February 12, 2008 || Mount Lemmon || Mount Lemmon Survey || — || align=right | 1.6 km || 
|-id=634 bgcolor=#E9E9E9
| 494634 ||  || — || January 10, 2008 || Kitt Peak || Spacewatch || — || align=right | 1.7 km || 
|-id=635 bgcolor=#d6d6d6
| 494635 ||  || — || January 20, 2010 || WISE || WISE || — || align=right | 2.6 km || 
|-id=636 bgcolor=#d6d6d6
| 494636 ||  || — || April 5, 2010 || WISE || WISE || 7:4 || align=right | 5.2 km || 
|-id=637 bgcolor=#d6d6d6
| 494637 ||  || — || November 10, 2004 || Kitt Peak || Spacewatch || — || align=right | 4.8 km || 
|-id=638 bgcolor=#fefefe
| 494638 ||  || — || November 10, 2004 || Kitt Peak || Spacewatch || — || align=right data-sort-value="0.99" | 990 m || 
|-id=639 bgcolor=#d6d6d6
| 494639 ||  || — || January 23, 2006 || Kitt Peak || Spacewatch || — || align=right | 3.1 km || 
|-id=640 bgcolor=#fefefe
| 494640 ||  || — || September 2, 2008 || Kitt Peak || Spacewatch || — || align=right data-sort-value="0.86" | 860 m || 
|-id=641 bgcolor=#fefefe
| 494641 ||  || — || August 22, 2004 || Kitt Peak || Spacewatch || H || align=right data-sort-value="0.48" | 480 m || 
|-id=642 bgcolor=#d6d6d6
| 494642 ||  || — || February 25, 2006 || Kitt Peak || Spacewatch || EUP || align=right | 4.3 km || 
|-id=643 bgcolor=#d6d6d6
| 494643 ||  || — || August 27, 2009 || Kitt Peak || Spacewatch || — || align=right | 3.2 km || 
|-id=644 bgcolor=#E9E9E9
| 494644 ||  || — || March 14, 2004 || Kitt Peak || Spacewatch || — || align=right | 1.2 km || 
|-id=645 bgcolor=#E9E9E9
| 494645 ||  || — || March 14, 2004 || Kitt Peak || Spacewatch || EUN || align=right | 1.3 km || 
|-id=646 bgcolor=#fefefe
| 494646 ||  || — || October 10, 2007 || Mount Lemmon || Mount Lemmon Survey ||  || align=right | 1.2 km || 
|-id=647 bgcolor=#fefefe
| 494647 ||  || — || October 26, 2008 || Mount Lemmon || Mount Lemmon Survey ||  || align=right data-sort-value="0.96" | 960 m || 
|-id=648 bgcolor=#E9E9E9
| 494648 ||  || — || March 5, 1994 || Kitt Peak || Spacewatch ||  || align=right | 2.6 km || 
|-id=649 bgcolor=#fefefe
| 494649 ||  || — || December 15, 2009 || Mount Lemmon || Mount Lemmon Survey ||  || align=right data-sort-value="0.86" | 860 m || 
|-id=650 bgcolor=#fefefe
| 494650 ||  || — || February 20, 2006 || Kitt Peak || Spacewatch ||  || align=right data-sort-value="0.82" | 820 m || 
|-id=651 bgcolor=#fefefe
| 494651 ||  || — || April 14, 2002 || Socorro || LINEAR ||  || align=right | 1.1 km || 
|-id=652 bgcolor=#d6d6d6
| 494652 ||  || — || January 11, 1999 || Kitt Peak || Spacewatch ||  || align=right | 2.9 km || 
|-id=653 bgcolor=#fefefe
| 494653 ||  || — || December 24, 2005 || Kitt Peak || Spacewatch ||  || align=right | 2.1 km || 
|-id=654 bgcolor=#fefefe
| 494654 ||  || — || September 20, 1995 || Kitt Peak || Spacewatch ||  || align=right data-sort-value="0.67" | 670 m || 
|-id=655 bgcolor=#C2FFFF
| 494655 ||  || — || November 15, 1998 || Kitt Peak || Spacewatch || L4006 || align=right | 10 km || 
|-id=656 bgcolor=#d6d6d6
| 494656 ||  || — || February 1, 2000 || Kitt Peak || Spacewatch ||  || align=right | 2.3 km || 
|-id=657 bgcolor=#E9E9E9
| 494657 ||  || — || October 1, 2000 || Socorro || LINEAR || CLO || align=right | 2.2 km || 
|-id=658 bgcolor=#FFC2E0
| 494658 ||  || — || October 25, 2000 || Socorro || LINEAR || APOPHAmooncritical || align=right data-sort-value="0.30" | 300 m || 
|-id=659 bgcolor=#fefefe
| 494659 ||  || — || December 21, 2000 || Kitt Peak || Spacewatch || H || align=right data-sort-value="0.70" | 700 m || 
|-id=660 bgcolor=#FA8072
| 494660 ||  || — || September 12, 2001 || Socorro || LINEAR || H || align=right data-sort-value="0.81" | 810 m || 
|-id=661 bgcolor=#FA8072
| 494661 ||  || — || September 10, 2001 || Socorro || LINEAR ||  || align=right | 1.5 km || 
|-id=662 bgcolor=#E9E9E9
| 494662 ||  || — || September 12, 2001 || Socorro || LINEAR ||  || align=right | 1.0 km || 
|-id=663 bgcolor=#fefefe
| 494663 ||  || — || August 24, 2001 || Anderson Mesa || LONEOS ||  || align=right data-sort-value="0.74" | 740 m || 
|-id=664 bgcolor=#E9E9E9
| 494664 ||  || — || August 19, 2001 || Socorro || LINEAR ||  || align=right | 2.5 km || 
|-id=665 bgcolor=#E9E9E9
| 494665 ||  || — || October 14, 2001 || Socorro || LINEAR ||  || align=right | 1.0 km || 
|-id=666 bgcolor=#E9E9E9
| 494666 ||  || — || October 16, 2001 || Socorro || LINEAR ||  || align=right | 1.1 km || 
|-id=667 bgcolor=#B88A00
| 494667 ||  || — || August 24, 2001 || Socorro || LINEAR || unusual || align=right | 3.9 km || 
|-id=668 bgcolor=#fefefe
| 494668 ||  || — || December 9, 2001 || Socorro || LINEAR || H || align=right data-sort-value="0.87" | 870 m || 
|-id=669 bgcolor=#E9E9E9
| 494669 ||  || — || December 19, 2001 || Socorro || LINEAR ||  || align=right | 2.6 km || 
|-id=670 bgcolor=#FA8072
| 494670 ||  || — || June 18, 2002 || Socorro || LINEAR ||  || align=right data-sort-value="0.69" | 690 m || 
|-id=671 bgcolor=#fefefe
| 494671 ||  || — || August 30, 2002 || Palomar || NEAT ||  || align=right data-sort-value="0.64" | 640 m || 
|-id=672 bgcolor=#d6d6d6
| 494672 ||  || — || September 14, 2002 || Palomar || NEAT ||  || align=right | 2.0 km || 
|-id=673 bgcolor=#d6d6d6
| 494673 ||  || — || September 16, 2002 || Palomar || NEAT ||  || align=right | 2.3 km || 
|-id=674 bgcolor=#d6d6d6
| 494674 ||  || — || October 4, 2002 || Apache Point || SDSS ||  || align=right | 2.3 km || 
|-id=675 bgcolor=#d6d6d6
| 494675 ||  || — || November 6, 2002 || Needville || Needville Obs. || Tj (2.95) || align=right | 3.7 km || 
|-id=676 bgcolor=#E9E9E9
| 494676 ||  || — || November 6, 2002 || Anderson Mesa || LONEOS ||  || align=right | 2.9 km || 
|-id=677 bgcolor=#FA8072
| 494677 ||  || — || September 18, 2003 || Kitt Peak || Spacewatch ||  || align=right data-sort-value="0.59" | 590 m || 
|-id=678 bgcolor=#d6d6d6
| 494678 ||  || — || September 16, 2003 || Kitt Peak || Spacewatch ||  || align=right | 1.8 km || 
|-id=679 bgcolor=#fefefe
| 494679 ||  || — || September 21, 2003 || Anderson Mesa || LONEOS || NYS || align=right data-sort-value="0.72" | 720 m || 
|-id=680 bgcolor=#fefefe
| 494680 ||  || — || September 26, 2003 || Apache Point || SDSS ||  || align=right data-sort-value="0.60" | 600 m || 
|-id=681 bgcolor=#d6d6d6
| 494681 ||  || — || September 16, 2003 || Kitt Peak || Spacewatch || EOS || align=right | 2.4 km || 
|-id=682 bgcolor=#d6d6d6
| 494682 ||  || — || September 19, 2003 || Campo Imperatore || CINEOS || EOS || align=right | 2.7 km || 
|-id=683 bgcolor=#fefefe
| 494683 ||  || — || October 19, 2003 || Kitt Peak || Spacewatch ||  || align=right data-sort-value="0.85" | 850 m || 
|-id=684 bgcolor=#d6d6d6
| 494684 ||  || — || November 30, 2003 || Kitt Peak || Spacewatch ||  || align=right | 2.4 km || 
|-id=685 bgcolor=#E9E9E9
| 494685 ||  || — || January 22, 2004 || Socorro || LINEAR ||  || align=right | 1.1 km || 
|-id=686 bgcolor=#fefefe
| 494686 ||  || — || February 12, 2004 || Kitt Peak || Spacewatch || H || align=right data-sort-value="0.68" | 680 m || 
|-id=687 bgcolor=#E9E9E9
| 494687 ||  || — || March 15, 2004 || Socorro || LINEAR ||  || align=right | 1.6 km || 
|-id=688 bgcolor=#E9E9E9
| 494688 ||  || — || March 17, 2004 || Kitt Peak || Spacewatch ||  || align=right | 1.3 km || 
|-id=689 bgcolor=#FFC2E0
| 494689 ||  || — || May 9, 2004 || Socorro || LINEAR || APOcritical || align=right data-sort-value="0.62" | 620 m || 
|-id=690 bgcolor=#FFC2E0
| 494690 ||  || — || May 11, 2004 || Socorro || LINEAR || APOPHA || align=right data-sort-value="0.35" | 350 m || 
|-id=691 bgcolor=#E9E9E9
| 494691 ||  || — || May 28, 2004 || Kitt Peak || Spacewatch ||  || align=right | 1.4 km || 
|-id=692 bgcolor=#E9E9E9
| 494692 ||  || — || August 8, 2004 || Bergisch Gladbach || W. Bickel ||  || align=right | 2.0 km || 
|-id=693 bgcolor=#fefefe
| 494693 ||  || — || August 10, 2004 || Socorro || LINEAR ||  || align=right data-sort-value="0.76" | 760 m || 
|-id=694 bgcolor=#E9E9E9
| 494694 ||  || — || September 8, 2004 || Palomar || NEAT ||  || align=right | 2.1 km || 
|-id=695 bgcolor=#fefefe
| 494695 ||  || — || September 15, 2004 || Anderson Mesa || LONEOS ||  || align=right data-sort-value="0.79" | 790 m || 
|-id=696 bgcolor=#FFC2E0
| 494696 ||  || — || September 13, 2004 || Palomar || NEAT || AMO || align=right data-sort-value="0.45" | 450 m || 
|-id=697 bgcolor=#FFC2E0
| 494697 ||  || — || September 24, 2004 || Siding Spring || SSS || APOPHA || align=right data-sort-value="0.25" | 250 m || 
|-id=698 bgcolor=#E9E9E9
| 494698 ||  || — || October 8, 2004 || Socorro || LINEAR || PAL || align=right | 3.2 km || 
|-id=699 bgcolor=#d6d6d6
| 494699 ||  || — || October 5, 2004 || Kitt Peak || Spacewatch ||  || align=right | 2.5 km || 
|-id=700 bgcolor=#E9E9E9
| 494700 ||  || — || September 7, 2004 || Socorro || LINEAR ||  || align=right | 2.0 km || 
|}

494701–494800 

|-bgcolor=#fefefe
| 494701 ||  || — || October 8, 2004 || Socorro || LINEAR || H || align=right data-sort-value="0.81" | 810 m || 
|-id=702 bgcolor=#fefefe
| 494702 ||  || — || November 9, 2004 || Catalina || CSS ||  || align=right | 1.1 km || 
|-id=703 bgcolor=#FA8072
| 494703 ||  || — || December 14, 2004 || Socorro || LINEAR ||  || align=right | 1.1 km || 
|-id=704 bgcolor=#d6d6d6
| 494704 ||  || — || December 21, 2004 || Catalina || CSS || EUP || align=right | 3.8 km || 
|-id=705 bgcolor=#fefefe
| 494705 ||  || — || March 3, 2005 || Kitt Peak || Spacewatch || NYS || align=right data-sort-value="0.75" | 750 m || 
|-id=706 bgcolor=#FFC2E0
| 494706 ||  || — || April 3, 2005 || Socorro || LINEAR || APO +1km || align=right | 1.6 km || 
|-id=707 bgcolor=#E9E9E9
| 494707 ||  || — || March 10, 2005 || Catalina || CSS ||  || align=right data-sort-value="0.96" | 960 m || 
|-id=708 bgcolor=#fefefe
| 494708 ||  || — || May 8, 2005 || Anderson Mesa || LONEOS ||  || align=right data-sort-value="0.79" | 790 m || 
|-id=709 bgcolor=#E9E9E9
| 494709 ||  || — || June 8, 2005 || Kitt Peak || Spacewatch ||  || align=right data-sort-value="0.83" | 830 m || 
|-id=710 bgcolor=#FFC2E0
| 494710 ||  || — || June 30, 2005 || Catalina || CSS || ATEPHA || align=right data-sort-value="0.25" | 250 m || 
|-id=711 bgcolor=#E9E9E9
| 494711 ||  || — || May 20, 2005 || Mount Lemmon || Mount Lemmon Survey ||  || align=right data-sort-value="0.84" | 840 m || 
|-id=712 bgcolor=#E9E9E9
| 494712 ||  || — || July 4, 2005 || Kitt Peak || Spacewatch ||  || align=right data-sort-value="0.94" | 940 m || 
|-id=713 bgcolor=#FFC2E0
| 494713 ||  || — || July 29, 2005 || Siding Spring || SSS || APOcritical || align=right data-sort-value="0.54" | 540 m || 
|-id=714 bgcolor=#E9E9E9
| 494714 ||  || — || August 26, 2005 || Palomar || NEAT ||  || align=right | 1.6 km || 
|-id=715 bgcolor=#fefefe
| 494715 ||  || — || August 28, 2005 || Anderson Mesa || LONEOS ||  || align=right data-sort-value="0.68" | 680 m || 
|-id=716 bgcolor=#E9E9E9
| 494716 ||  || — || September 24, 2005 || Kitt Peak || Spacewatch ||  || align=right | 1.3 km || 
|-id=717 bgcolor=#E9E9E9
| 494717 ||  || — || September 29, 2005 || Kitt Peak || Spacewatch ||  || align=right | 1.7 km || 
|-id=718 bgcolor=#d6d6d6
| 494718 ||  || — || September 25, 2005 || Kitt Peak || Spacewatch ||  || align=right | 2.0 km || 
|-id=719 bgcolor=#E9E9E9
| 494719 ||  || — || September 29, 2005 || Kitt Peak || Spacewatch ||  || align=right | 1.5 km || 
|-id=720 bgcolor=#E9E9E9
| 494720 ||  || — || September 29, 2005 || Kitt Peak || Spacewatch ||  || align=right | 2.1 km || 
|-id=721 bgcolor=#E9E9E9
| 494721 ||  || — || September 23, 2005 || Kitt Peak || Spacewatch ||  || align=right | 2.0 km || 
|-id=722 bgcolor=#E9E9E9
| 494722 ||  || — || September 30, 2005 || Mount Lemmon || Mount Lemmon Survey ||  || align=right | 1.8 km || 
|-id=723 bgcolor=#E9E9E9
| 494723 ||  || — || September 30, 2005 || Mount Lemmon || Mount Lemmon Survey || MAR || align=right | 1.5 km || 
|-id=724 bgcolor=#E9E9E9
| 494724 ||  || — || September 22, 2005 || Palomar || NEAT ||  || align=right | 1.6 km || 
|-id=725 bgcolor=#fefefe
| 494725 ||  || — || September 29, 2005 || Mount Lemmon || Mount Lemmon Survey ||  || align=right data-sort-value="0.60" | 600 m || 
|-id=726 bgcolor=#FA8072
| 494726 ||  || — || October 1, 2005 || Socorro || LINEAR ||  || align=right | 1.1 km || 
|-id=727 bgcolor=#E9E9E9
| 494727 ||  || — || October 7, 2005 || Anderson Mesa || LONEOS ||  || align=right | 1.9 km || 
|-id=728 bgcolor=#E9E9E9
| 494728 ||  || — || October 25, 2005 || Kitt Peak || Spacewatch ||  || align=right | 1.8 km || 
|-id=729 bgcolor=#E9E9E9
| 494729 ||  || — || October 24, 2005 || Kitt Peak || Spacewatch ||  || align=right | 2.5 km || 
|-id=730 bgcolor=#E9E9E9
| 494730 ||  || — || October 23, 2005 || Catalina || CSS ||  || align=right | 1.9 km || 
|-id=731 bgcolor=#E9E9E9
| 494731 ||  || — || October 23, 2005 || Palomar || NEAT ||  || align=right | 1.7 km || 
|-id=732 bgcolor=#d6d6d6
| 494732 ||  || — || October 22, 2005 || Kitt Peak || Spacewatch || EOS || align=right | 2.5 km || 
|-id=733 bgcolor=#fefefe
| 494733 ||  || — || October 23, 2005 || Kitt Peak || Spacewatch ||  || align=right data-sort-value="0.61" | 610 m || 
|-id=734 bgcolor=#E9E9E9
| 494734 ||  || — || October 25, 2005 || Kitt Peak || Spacewatch ||  || align=right | 1.5 km || 
|-id=735 bgcolor=#E9E9E9
| 494735 ||  || — || October 25, 2005 || Kitt Peak || Spacewatch ||  || align=right | 1.5 km || 
|-id=736 bgcolor=#E9E9E9
| 494736 ||  || — || September 30, 2005 || Mount Lemmon || Mount Lemmon Survey ||  || align=right | 1.7 km || 
|-id=737 bgcolor=#E9E9E9
| 494737 ||  || — || October 1, 2005 || Mount Lemmon || Mount Lemmon Survey ||  || align=right | 1.2 km || 
|-id=738 bgcolor=#E9E9E9
| 494738 ||  || — || October 28, 2005 || Kitt Peak || Spacewatch || WIT || align=right | 1.7 km || 
|-id=739 bgcolor=#E9E9E9
| 494739 ||  || — || October 30, 2005 || Kitt Peak || Spacewatch ||  || align=right | 1.7 km || 
|-id=740 bgcolor=#E9E9E9
| 494740 ||  || — || October 26, 2005 || Kitt Peak || Spacewatch ||  || align=right | 1.9 km || 
|-id=741 bgcolor=#E9E9E9
| 494741 ||  || — || October 26, 2005 || Apache Point || A. C. Becker ||  || align=right | 1.3 km || 
|-id=742 bgcolor=#fefefe
| 494742 ||  || — || October 24, 2005 || Kitt Peak || Spacewatch || H || align=right data-sort-value="0.72" | 720 m || 
|-id=743 bgcolor=#E9E9E9
| 494743 ||  || — || October 28, 2005 || Catalina || CSS || WIT || align=right | 1.9 km || 
|-id=744 bgcolor=#fefefe
| 494744 ||  || — || October 31, 2005 || Mount Lemmon || Mount Lemmon Survey ||  || align=right data-sort-value="0.65" | 650 m || 
|-id=745 bgcolor=#E9E9E9
| 494745 ||  || — || October 27, 2005 || Kitt Peak || Spacewatch ||  || align=right | 1.2 km || 
|-id=746 bgcolor=#fefefe
| 494746 ||  || — || October 30, 2005 || Socorro || LINEAR || H || align=right data-sort-value="0.79" | 790 m || 
|-id=747 bgcolor=#fefefe
| 494747 ||  || — || October 25, 2005 || Kitt Peak || Spacewatch ||  || align=right data-sort-value="0.76" | 760 m || 
|-id=748 bgcolor=#E9E9E9
| 494748 ||  || — || November 29, 2005 || Kitt Peak || Spacewatch || IAN || align=right | 1.6 km || 
|-id=749 bgcolor=#E9E9E9
| 494749 ||  || — || November 5, 2005 || Kitt Peak || Spacewatch ||  || align=right | 2.3 km || 
|-id=750 bgcolor=#d6d6d6
| 494750 ||  || — || November 1, 2005 || Catalina || CSS ||  || align=right | 3.0 km || 
|-id=751 bgcolor=#d6d6d6
| 494751 ||  || — || November 29, 2005 || Mount Lemmon || Mount Lemmon Survey ||  || align=right | 2.7 km || 
|-id=752 bgcolor=#E9E9E9
| 494752 ||  || — || October 26, 2005 || Kitt Peak || Spacewatch ||  || align=right | 1.4 km || 
|-id=753 bgcolor=#E9E9E9
| 494753 ||  || — || December 21, 2005 || Kitt Peak || Spacewatch ||  || align=right | 1.5 km || 
|-id=754 bgcolor=#d6d6d6
| 494754 ||  || — || December 28, 2005 || Mount Lemmon || Mount Lemmon Survey ||  || align=right | 2.5 km || 
|-id=755 bgcolor=#d6d6d6
| 494755 ||  || — || December 28, 2005 || Mount Lemmon || Mount Lemmon Survey ||  || align=right | 2.0 km || 
|-id=756 bgcolor=#fefefe
| 494756 ||  || — || December 25, 2005 || Kitt Peak || Spacewatch ||  || align=right data-sort-value="0.58" | 580 m || 
|-id=757 bgcolor=#d6d6d6
| 494757 ||  || — || January 26, 2006 || Kitt Peak || Spacewatch ||  || align=right | 1.8 km || 
|-id=758 bgcolor=#fefefe
| 494758 ||  || — || January 25, 2006 || Kitt Peak || Spacewatch ||  || align=right data-sort-value="0.63" | 630 m || 
|-id=759 bgcolor=#fefefe
| 494759 ||  || — || January 23, 2006 || Mount Lemmon || Mount Lemmon Survey ||  || align=right data-sort-value="0.60" | 600 m || 
|-id=760 bgcolor=#d6d6d6
| 494760 ||  || — || December 6, 2005 || Mount Lemmon || Mount Lemmon Survey ||  || align=right | 2.9 km || 
|-id=761 bgcolor=#fefefe
| 494761 ||  || — || February 20, 2006 || Kitt Peak || Spacewatch || NYS || align=right data-sort-value="0.62" | 620 m || 
|-id=762 bgcolor=#d6d6d6
| 494762 ||  || — || February 25, 2006 || Mount Lemmon || Mount Lemmon Survey || EOS || align=right | 2.7 km || 
|-id=763 bgcolor=#fefefe
| 494763 ||  || — || February 25, 2006 || Kitt Peak || Spacewatch || NYS || align=right data-sort-value="0.49" | 490 m || 
|-id=764 bgcolor=#fefefe
| 494764 ||  || — || March 23, 2006 || Kitt Peak || Spacewatch || NYS || align=right data-sort-value="0.65" | 650 m || 
|-id=765 bgcolor=#d6d6d6
| 494765 ||  || — || April 2, 2006 || Anderson Mesa || LONEOS ||  || align=right | 2.9 km || 
|-id=766 bgcolor=#d6d6d6
| 494766 ||  || — || April 19, 2006 || Kitt Peak || Spacewatch ||  || align=right | 2.5 km || 
|-id=767 bgcolor=#d6d6d6
| 494767 ||  || — || April 20, 2006 || Kitt Peak || Spacewatch || EOS || align=right | 2.7 km || 
|-id=768 bgcolor=#fefefe
| 494768 ||  || — || April 25, 2006 || Kitt Peak || Spacewatch ||  || align=right data-sort-value="0.54" | 540 m || 
|-id=769 bgcolor=#fefefe
| 494769 ||  || — || April 27, 2006 || Kitt Peak || Spacewatch ||  || align=right data-sort-value="0.89" | 890 m || 
|-id=770 bgcolor=#fefefe
| 494770 ||  || — || April 30, 2006 || Kitt Peak || Spacewatch ||  || align=right data-sort-value="0.68" | 680 m || 
|-id=771 bgcolor=#d6d6d6
| 494771 ||  || — || May 2, 2006 || Mount Lemmon || Mount Lemmon Survey ||  || align=right | 2.2 km || 
|-id=772 bgcolor=#fefefe
| 494772 ||  || — || April 2, 2006 || Kitt Peak || Spacewatch ||  || align=right data-sort-value="0.79" | 790 m || 
|-id=773 bgcolor=#fefefe
| 494773 ||  || — || May 1, 2006 || Kitt Peak || Spacewatch || CHL || align=right | 1.9 km || 
|-id=774 bgcolor=#d6d6d6
| 494774 ||  || — || April 25, 2006 || Kitt Peak || Spacewatch ||  || align=right | 2.3 km || 
|-id=775 bgcolor=#d6d6d6
| 494775 ||  || — || May 20, 2006 || Kitt Peak || Spacewatch ||  || align=right | 3.2 km || 
|-id=776 bgcolor=#fefefe
| 494776 ||  || — || May 20, 2006 || Kitt Peak || Spacewatch ||  || align=right data-sort-value="0.61" | 610 m || 
|-id=777 bgcolor=#d6d6d6
| 494777 ||  || — || May 21, 2006 || Kitt Peak || Spacewatch ||  || align=right | 2.3 km || 
|-id=778 bgcolor=#d6d6d6
| 494778 ||  || — || May 4, 2006 || Kitt Peak || Spacewatch || TIR || align=right | 3.2 km || 
|-id=779 bgcolor=#d6d6d6
| 494779 ||  || — || May 7, 2006 || Mount Lemmon || Mount Lemmon Survey ||  || align=right | 2.6 km || 
|-id=780 bgcolor=#E9E9E9
| 494780 ||  || — || August 21, 2006 || Kitt Peak || Spacewatch ||  || align=right | 1.3 km || 
|-id=781 bgcolor=#E9E9E9
| 494781 ||  || — || September 14, 2006 || Kitt Peak || Spacewatch || MRX || align=right | 1.9 km || 
|-id=782 bgcolor=#fefefe
| 494782 ||  || — || September 24, 2006 || Kitt Peak || Spacewatch || critical || align=right data-sort-value="0.41" | 410 m || 
|-id=783 bgcolor=#fefefe
| 494783 ||  || — || September 30, 2006 || Mount Lemmon || Mount Lemmon Survey ||  || align=right data-sort-value="0.82" | 820 m || 
|-id=784 bgcolor=#E9E9E9
| 494784 ||  || — || October 12, 2006 || Kitt Peak || Spacewatch ||  || align=right | 2.3 km || 
|-id=785 bgcolor=#E9E9E9
| 494785 ||  || — || September 25, 2006 || Mount Lemmon || Mount Lemmon Survey ||  || align=right | 1.2 km || 
|-id=786 bgcolor=#E9E9E9
| 494786 ||  || — || September 17, 2006 || Catalina || CSS ||  || align=right | 1.0 km || 
|-id=787 bgcolor=#E9E9E9
| 494787 ||  || — || October 2, 2006 || Mount Lemmon || Mount Lemmon Survey || HNS || align=right | 1.9 km || 
|-id=788 bgcolor=#E9E9E9
| 494788 ||  || — || October 2, 2006 || Mount Lemmon || Mount Lemmon Survey ||  || align=right | 1.3 km || 
|-id=789 bgcolor=#E9E9E9
| 494789 ||  || — || October 4, 2006 || Mount Lemmon || Mount Lemmon Survey ||  || align=right data-sort-value="0.89" | 890 m || 
|-id=790 bgcolor=#E9E9E9
| 494790 ||  || — || September 30, 2006 || Catalina || CSS ||  || align=right | 2.7 km || 
|-id=791 bgcolor=#E9E9E9
| 494791 ||  || — || October 28, 2006 || Mount Lemmon || Mount Lemmon Survey ||  || align=right data-sort-value="0.82" | 820 m || 
|-id=792 bgcolor=#E9E9E9
| 494792 ||  || — || October 16, 2006 || Kitt Peak || Spacewatch || AGN || align=right | 2.0 km || 
|-id=793 bgcolor=#E9E9E9
| 494793 ||  || — || October 21, 2006 || Kitt Peak || Spacewatch ||  || align=right | 1.4 km || 
|-id=794 bgcolor=#fefefe
| 494794 ||  || — || October 23, 2006 || Catalina || CSS || H || align=right data-sort-value="0.82" | 820 m || 
|-id=795 bgcolor=#E9E9E9
| 494795 ||  || — || November 11, 2006 || Kitt Peak || Spacewatch ||  || align=right data-sort-value="0.78" | 780 m || 
|-id=796 bgcolor=#E9E9E9
| 494796 ||  || — || November 19, 2006 || Kitt Peak || Spacewatch ||  || align=right | 1.5 km || 
|-id=797 bgcolor=#E9E9E9
| 494797 ||  || — || December 9, 2006 || Kitt Peak || Spacewatch ||  || align=right | 2.1 km || 
|-id=798 bgcolor=#E9E9E9
| 494798 ||  || — || December 14, 2006 || Kitt Peak || Spacewatch ||  || align=right | 1.3 km || 
|-id=799 bgcolor=#E9E9E9
| 494799 ||  || — || December 23, 2006 || Mount Lemmon || Mount Lemmon Survey ||  || align=right | 1.8 km || 
|-id=800 bgcolor=#fefefe
| 494800 ||  || — || December 23, 2006 || Catalina || CSS || H || align=right data-sort-value="0.76" | 760 m || 
|}

494801–494900 

|-bgcolor=#E9E9E9
| 494801 ||  || — || November 21, 2006 || Mount Lemmon || Mount Lemmon Survey || CLO || align=right | 2.1 km || 
|-id=802 bgcolor=#E9E9E9
| 494802 ||  || — || January 17, 2007 || Catalina || CSS ||  || align=right | 2.9 km || 
|-id=803 bgcolor=#E9E9E9
| 494803 ||  || — || January 10, 2007 || Mount Lemmon || Mount Lemmon Survey ||  || align=right | 1.5 km || 
|-id=804 bgcolor=#fefefe
| 494804 ||  || — || November 16, 2006 || Mount Lemmon || Mount Lemmon Survey ||  || align=right data-sort-value="0.87" | 870 m || 
|-id=805 bgcolor=#E9E9E9
| 494805 ||  || — || February 21, 2007 || Mount Lemmon || Mount Lemmon Survey ||  || align=right | 2.0 km || 
|-id=806 bgcolor=#fefefe
| 494806 ||  || — || March 16, 2007 || Mount Lemmon || Mount Lemmon Survey ||  || align=right data-sort-value="0.58" | 580 m || 
|-id=807 bgcolor=#d6d6d6
| 494807 ||  || — || April 25, 2007 || Kitt Peak || Spacewatch ||  || align=right | 2.5 km || 
|-id=808 bgcolor=#d6d6d6
| 494808 ||  || — || June 12, 2007 || Kitt Peak || Spacewatch || LIX || align=right | 3.3 km || 
|-id=809 bgcolor=#E9E9E9
| 494809 ||  || — || July 18, 2007 || Mount Lemmon || Mount Lemmon Survey ||  || align=right | 2.0 km || 
|-id=810 bgcolor=#d6d6d6
| 494810 ||  || — || September 13, 2007 || Catalina || CSS || 3:2 || align=right | 5.2 km || 
|-id=811 bgcolor=#d6d6d6
| 494811 ||  || — || September 10, 2007 || Kitt Peak || Spacewatch ||  || align=right | 2.4 km || 
|-id=812 bgcolor=#d6d6d6
| 494812 ||  || — || September 13, 2007 || Kitt Peak || Spacewatch ||  || align=right | 2.5 km || 
|-id=813 bgcolor=#fefefe
| 494813 ||  || — || September 5, 2007 || Catalina || CSS ||  || align=right data-sort-value="0.74" | 740 m || 
|-id=814 bgcolor=#fefefe
| 494814 ||  || — || September 5, 2007 || Catalina || CSS || H || align=right data-sort-value="0.71" | 710 m || 
|-id=815 bgcolor=#d6d6d6
| 494815 ||  || — || April 25, 2006 || Kitt Peak || Spacewatch ||  || align=right | 2.7 km || 
|-id=816 bgcolor=#d6d6d6
| 494816 ||  || — || September 4, 2007 || Catalina || CSS ||  || align=right | 3.7 km || 
|-id=817 bgcolor=#fefefe
| 494817 ||  || — || September 24, 2007 || Kitt Peak || Spacewatch ||  || align=right data-sort-value="0.72" | 720 m || 
|-id=818 bgcolor=#d6d6d6
| 494818 ||  || — || September 13, 2007 || Mount Lemmon || Mount Lemmon Survey ||  || align=right | 3.1 km || 
|-id=819 bgcolor=#fefefe
| 494819 ||  || — || October 6, 2007 || Kitt Peak || Spacewatch || NYS || align=right data-sort-value="0.78" | 780 m || 
|-id=820 bgcolor=#fefefe
| 494820 ||  || — || September 10, 2007 || Mount Lemmon || Mount Lemmon Survey ||  || align=right data-sort-value="0.66" | 660 m || 
|-id=821 bgcolor=#fefefe
| 494821 ||  || — || September 21, 2007 || XuYi || PMO NEO ||  || align=right data-sort-value="0.78" | 780 m || 
|-id=822 bgcolor=#fefefe
| 494822 ||  || — || September 15, 2007 || Mount Lemmon || Mount Lemmon Survey ||  || align=right data-sort-value="0.55" | 550 m || 
|-id=823 bgcolor=#fefefe
| 494823 ||  || — || October 7, 2007 || Catalina || CSS || H || align=right data-sort-value="0.74" | 740 m || 
|-id=824 bgcolor=#d6d6d6
| 494824 ||  || — || September 15, 2007 || Catalina || CSS ||  || align=right | 3.5 km || 
|-id=825 bgcolor=#fefefe
| 494825 ||  || — || September 10, 2007 || Kitt Peak || Spacewatch || NYS || align=right data-sort-value="0.65" | 650 m || 
|-id=826 bgcolor=#fefefe
| 494826 ||  || — || October 8, 2007 || Catalina || CSS ||  || align=right data-sort-value="0.80" | 800 m || 
|-id=827 bgcolor=#fefefe
| 494827 ||  || — || October 8, 2007 || Kitt Peak || Spacewatch ||  || align=right data-sort-value="0.56" | 560 m || 
|-id=828 bgcolor=#fefefe
| 494828 ||  || — || October 8, 2007 || Kitt Peak || Spacewatch || NYS || align=right data-sort-value="0.69" | 690 m || 
|-id=829 bgcolor=#E9E9E9
| 494829 ||  || — || October 10, 2007 || Anderson Mesa || LONEOS ||  || align=right | 2.4 km || 
|-id=830 bgcolor=#d6d6d6
| 494830 ||  || — || September 12, 2007 || Mount Lemmon || Mount Lemmon Survey || THM || align=right | 2.3 km || 
|-id=831 bgcolor=#fefefe
| 494831 ||  || — || September 18, 2007 || Anderson Mesa || LONEOS ||  || align=right data-sort-value="0.62" | 620 m || 
|-id=832 bgcolor=#d6d6d6
| 494832 ||  || — || October 12, 2007 || Kitt Peak || Spacewatch || BGL || align=right | 2.2 km || 
|-id=833 bgcolor=#d6d6d6
| 494833 ||  || — || October 8, 2007 || Kitt Peak || Spacewatch || 3:2critical || align=right | 2.7 km || 
|-id=834 bgcolor=#fefefe
| 494834 ||  || — || October 11, 2007 || Catalina || CSS ||  || align=right data-sort-value="0.95" | 950 m || 
|-id=835 bgcolor=#d6d6d6
| 494835 ||  || — || October 10, 2007 || Kitt Peak || Spacewatch ||  || align=right | 2.4 km || 
|-id=836 bgcolor=#FA8072
| 494836 ||  || — || September 18, 2007 || Anderson Mesa || LONEOS ||  || align=right data-sort-value="0.61" | 610 m || 
|-id=837 bgcolor=#d6d6d6
| 494837 ||  || — || October 30, 2007 || Kitt Peak || Spacewatch ||  || align=right | 2.5 km || 
|-id=838 bgcolor=#FA8072
| 494838 ||  || — || October 30, 2007 || Kitt Peak || Spacewatch ||  || align=right data-sort-value="0.74" | 740 m || 
|-id=839 bgcolor=#d6d6d6
| 494839 ||  || — || November 13, 2007 || Kitt Peak || Spacewatch || TIR || align=right | 3.4 km || 
|-id=840 bgcolor=#fefefe
| 494840 ||  || — || November 13, 2007 || Kitt Peak || Spacewatch || H || align=right data-sort-value="0.56" | 560 m || 
|-id=841 bgcolor=#E9E9E9
| 494841 ||  || — || October 14, 2007 || Socorro || LINEAR ||  || align=right | 2.4 km || 
|-id=842 bgcolor=#E9E9E9
| 494842 ||  || — || November 3, 2007 || Mount Lemmon || Mount Lemmon Survey ||  || align=right data-sort-value="0.75" | 750 m || 
|-id=843 bgcolor=#E9E9E9
| 494843 ||  || — || January 10, 2008 || Mount Lemmon || Mount Lemmon Survey ||  || align=right data-sort-value="0.86" | 860 m || 
|-id=844 bgcolor=#E9E9E9
| 494844 ||  || — || January 10, 2008 || Mount Lemmon || Mount Lemmon Survey ||  || align=right | 1.6 km || 
|-id=845 bgcolor=#fefefe
| 494845 ||  || — || December 30, 2007 || Catalina || CSS || H || align=right data-sort-value="0.73" | 730 m || 
|-id=846 bgcolor=#E9E9E9
| 494846 ||  || — || January 12, 2008 || Kitt Peak || Spacewatch ||  || align=right data-sort-value="0.99" | 990 m || 
|-id=847 bgcolor=#E9E9E9
| 494847 ||  || — || January 1, 2008 || Mount Lemmon || Mount Lemmon Survey ||  || align=right | 1.3 km || 
|-id=848 bgcolor=#E9E9E9
| 494848 ||  || — || February 1, 2008 || Kitt Peak || Spacewatch ||  || align=right | 1.3 km || 
|-id=849 bgcolor=#E9E9E9
| 494849 ||  || — || October 9, 2007 || Mount Lemmon || Mount Lemmon Survey ||  || align=right | 2.2 km || 
|-id=850 bgcolor=#d6d6d6
| 494850 ||  || — || February 6, 2008 || XuYi || PMO NEO ||  || align=right | 3.2 km || 
|-id=851 bgcolor=#E9E9E9
| 494851 ||  || — || February 1, 2008 || Kitt Peak || Spacewatch ||  || align=right | 1.3 km || 
|-id=852 bgcolor=#E9E9E9
| 494852 ||  || — || February 9, 2008 || Kitt Peak || Spacewatch ||  || align=right | 1.3 km || 
|-id=853 bgcolor=#d6d6d6
| 494853 ||  || — || February 2, 2008 || Kitt Peak || Spacewatch || 3:2 || align=right | 4.0 km || 
|-id=854 bgcolor=#E9E9E9
| 494854 ||  || — || February 2, 2008 || Catalina || CSS ||  || align=right | 1.3 km || 
|-id=855 bgcolor=#E9E9E9
| 494855 ||  || — || February 12, 2008 || Mount Lemmon || Mount Lemmon Survey ||  || align=right | 1.7 km || 
|-id=856 bgcolor=#E9E9E9
| 494856 ||  || — || February 14, 2008 || Catalina || CSS ||  || align=right | 1.5 km || 
|-id=857 bgcolor=#E9E9E9
| 494857 ||  || — || February 29, 2008 || Mount Lemmon || Mount Lemmon Survey ||  || align=right | 1.4 km || 
|-id=858 bgcolor=#E9E9E9
| 494858 ||  || — || March 1, 2008 || Kitt Peak || Spacewatch ||  || align=right | 1.3 km || 
|-id=859 bgcolor=#E9E9E9
| 494859 ||  || — || March 1, 2008 || Kitt Peak || Spacewatch ||  || align=right | 1.2 km || 
|-id=860 bgcolor=#E9E9E9
| 494860 ||  || — || February 2, 2008 || Kitt Peak || Spacewatch ||  || align=right | 1.6 km || 
|-id=861 bgcolor=#E9E9E9
| 494861 ||  || — || February 28, 2008 || Kitt Peak || Spacewatch ||  || align=right | 1.3 km || 
|-id=862 bgcolor=#E9E9E9
| 494862 ||  || — || February 3, 2008 || Kitt Peak || Spacewatch ||  || align=right | 1.2 km || 
|-id=863 bgcolor=#fefefe
| 494863 ||  || — || February 2, 2008 || Kitt Peak || Spacewatch ||  || align=right data-sort-value="0.78" | 780 m || 
|-id=864 bgcolor=#E9E9E9
| 494864 ||  || — || January 19, 2008 || Mount Lemmon || Mount Lemmon Survey ||  || align=right | 1.4 km || 
|-id=865 bgcolor=#E9E9E9
| 494865 ||  || — || February 29, 2008 || Kitt Peak || Spacewatch ||  || align=right | 1.4 km || 
|-id=866 bgcolor=#E9E9E9
| 494866 ||  || — || February 13, 2008 || Mount Lemmon || Mount Lemmon Survey ||  || align=right | 1.0 km || 
|-id=867 bgcolor=#d6d6d6
| 494867 ||  || — || March 28, 2008 || Mount Lemmon || Mount Lemmon Survey || 3:2 || align=right | 3.6 km || 
|-id=868 bgcolor=#E9E9E9
| 494868 ||  || — || March 30, 2008 || Kitt Peak || Spacewatch ||  || align=right | 1.9 km || 
|-id=869 bgcolor=#E9E9E9
| 494869 ||  || — || April 3, 2008 || Mount Lemmon || Mount Lemmon Survey ||  || align=right | 1.4 km || 
|-id=870 bgcolor=#E9E9E9
| 494870 ||  || — || April 4, 2008 || Mount Lemmon || Mount Lemmon Survey ||  || align=right | 1.3 km || 
|-id=871 bgcolor=#E9E9E9
| 494871 ||  || — || March 30, 2008 || Kitt Peak || Spacewatch ||  || align=right | 1.5 km || 
|-id=872 bgcolor=#E9E9E9
| 494872 ||  || — || March 5, 2008 || Mount Lemmon || Mount Lemmon Survey ||  || align=right | 2.3 km || 
|-id=873 bgcolor=#E9E9E9
| 494873 ||  || — || April 7, 2008 || Kitt Peak || Spacewatch || MIS || align=right | 1.1 km || 
|-id=874 bgcolor=#E9E9E9
| 494874 ||  || — || April 8, 2008 || Mount Lemmon || Mount Lemmon Survey ||  || align=right | 1.5 km || 
|-id=875 bgcolor=#E9E9E9
| 494875 ||  || — || April 3, 2008 || Kitt Peak || Spacewatch || EUN || align=right | 1.4 km || 
|-id=876 bgcolor=#E9E9E9
| 494876 ||  || — || April 24, 2008 || Kitt Peak || Spacewatch ||  || align=right | 1.8 km || 
|-id=877 bgcolor=#E9E9E9
| 494877 ||  || — || April 6, 2008 || Mount Lemmon || Mount Lemmon Survey ||  || align=right | 1.6 km || 
|-id=878 bgcolor=#E9E9E9
| 494878 ||  || — || March 29, 2008 || Mount Lemmon || Mount Lemmon Survey || HNS || align=right | 1.5 km || 
|-id=879 bgcolor=#E9E9E9
| 494879 ||  || — || April 26, 2008 || Mount Lemmon || Mount Lemmon Survey ||  || align=right | 1.8 km || 
|-id=880 bgcolor=#FFC2E0
| 494880 ||  || — || September 23, 2008 || Socorro || LINEAR || APO || align=right data-sort-value="0.38" | 380 m || 
|-id=881 bgcolor=#fefefe
| 494881 ||  || — || September 20, 2008 || Kitt Peak || Spacewatch || MAS || align=right data-sort-value="0.71" | 710 m || 
|-id=882 bgcolor=#d6d6d6
| 494882 ||  || — || September 20, 2008 || Mount Lemmon || Mount Lemmon Survey || THM || align=right | 2.1 km || 
|-id=883 bgcolor=#d6d6d6
| 494883 ||  || — || September 20, 2008 || Kitt Peak || Spacewatch ||  || align=right | 3.1 km || 
|-id=884 bgcolor=#E9E9E9
| 494884 ||  || — || August 26, 2008 || Črni Vrh || J. Zakrajšek ||  || align=right | 3.2 km || 
|-id=885 bgcolor=#d6d6d6
| 494885 ||  || — || September 9, 2008 || Kitt Peak || Spacewatch ||  || align=right | 2.5 km || 
|-id=886 bgcolor=#d6d6d6
| 494886 ||  || — || September 21, 2008 || Kitt Peak || Spacewatch || ALA || align=right | 3.5 km || 
|-id=887 bgcolor=#E9E9E9
| 494887 ||  || — || July 30, 2008 || Kitt Peak || Spacewatch ||  || align=right | 1.8 km || 
|-id=888 bgcolor=#FA8072
| 494888 ||  || — || September 24, 2008 || Mount Lemmon || Mount Lemmon Survey ||  || align=right data-sort-value="0.61" | 610 m || 
|-id=889 bgcolor=#d6d6d6
| 494889 ||  || — || September 24, 2008 || Kitt Peak || Spacewatch || Tj (2.96) || align=right | 4.1 km || 
|-id=890 bgcolor=#E9E9E9
| 494890 ||  || — || September 23, 2008 || Catalina || CSS || WAT || align=right | 3.3 km || 
|-id=891 bgcolor=#fefefe
| 494891 ||  || — || September 23, 2008 || Mount Lemmon || Mount Lemmon Survey ||  || align=right data-sort-value="0.65" | 650 m || 
|-id=892 bgcolor=#d6d6d6
| 494892 ||  || — || September 26, 2008 || Kitt Peak || Spacewatch || ALA || align=right | 3.1 km || 
|-id=893 bgcolor=#fefefe
| 494893 ||  || — || September 22, 2008 || Kitt Peak || Spacewatch ||  || align=right data-sort-value="0.78" | 780 m || 
|-id=894 bgcolor=#fefefe
| 494894 ||  || — || October 1, 2008 || Kitt Peak || Spacewatch ||  || align=right data-sort-value="0.64" | 640 m || 
|-id=895 bgcolor=#d6d6d6
| 494895 ||  || — || October 20, 2008 || Mount Lemmon || Mount Lemmon Survey ||  || align=right | 2.8 km || 
|-id=896 bgcolor=#fefefe
| 494896 ||  || — || September 22, 2008 || Kitt Peak || Spacewatch || MAS || align=right data-sort-value="0.62" | 620 m || 
|-id=897 bgcolor=#fefefe
| 494897 ||  || — || October 25, 2008 || Socorro || LINEAR ||  || align=right data-sort-value="0.66" | 660 m || 
|-id=898 bgcolor=#d6d6d6
| 494898 ||  || — || October 22, 2008 || Kitt Peak || Spacewatch ||  || align=right | 5.0 km || 
|-id=899 bgcolor=#d6d6d6
| 494899 ||  || — || October 23, 2008 || Kitt Peak || Spacewatch ||  || align=right | 2.5 km || 
|-id=900 bgcolor=#fefefe
| 494900 ||  || — || September 7, 2008 || Mount Lemmon || Mount Lemmon Survey ||  || align=right data-sort-value="0.62" | 620 m || 
|}

494901–495000 

|-bgcolor=#FA8072
| 494901 ||  || — || October 30, 2008 || Kitt Peak || Spacewatch || H || align=right data-sort-value="0.47" | 470 m || 
|-id=902 bgcolor=#d6d6d6
| 494902 ||  || — || October 24, 2008 || Kitt Peak || Spacewatch || HYG || align=right | 2.5 km || 
|-id=903 bgcolor=#d6d6d6
| 494903 ||  || — || October 1, 2008 || Catalina || CSS ||  || align=right | 2.8 km || 
|-id=904 bgcolor=#FA8072
| 494904 ||  || — || October 28, 2008 || Kitt Peak || Spacewatch ||  || align=right data-sort-value="0.82" | 820 m || 
|-id=905 bgcolor=#d6d6d6
| 494905 ||  || — || October 28, 2008 || Kitt Peak || Spacewatch ||  || align=right | 2.3 km || 
|-id=906 bgcolor=#d6d6d6
| 494906 ||  || — || October 28, 2008 || Mount Lemmon || Mount Lemmon Survey || THM || align=right | 2.2 km || 
|-id=907 bgcolor=#d6d6d6
| 494907 ||  || — || October 28, 2008 || Kitt Peak || Spacewatch || EUP || align=right | 5.1 km || 
|-id=908 bgcolor=#d6d6d6
| 494908 ||  || — || October 5, 2008 || La Sagra || OAM Obs. || EOS || align=right | 4.0 km || 
|-id=909 bgcolor=#fefefe
| 494909 ||  || — || October 30, 2008 || Kitt Peak || Spacewatch ||  || align=right data-sort-value="0.90" | 900 m || 
|-id=910 bgcolor=#d6d6d6
| 494910 ||  || — || October 26, 2008 || Kitt Peak || Spacewatch ||  || align=right | 3.2 km || 
|-id=911 bgcolor=#d6d6d6
| 494911 ||  || — || October 28, 2008 || Kitt Peak || Spacewatch ||  || align=right | 2.5 km || 
|-id=912 bgcolor=#d6d6d6
| 494912 ||  || — || November 2, 2008 || Kitt Peak || Spacewatch ||  || align=right | 2.4 km || 
|-id=913 bgcolor=#d6d6d6
| 494913 ||  || — || October 26, 2008 || Kitt Peak || Spacewatch ||  || align=right | 3.3 km || 
|-id=914 bgcolor=#d6d6d6
| 494914 ||  || — || October 22, 2008 || Kitt Peak || Spacewatch ||  || align=right | 3.5 km || 
|-id=915 bgcolor=#E9E9E9
| 494915 ||  || — || October 26, 2008 || Kitt Peak || Spacewatch ||  || align=right data-sort-value="0.80" | 800 m || 
|-id=916 bgcolor=#fefefe
| 494916 ||  || — || February 24, 2006 || Kitt Peak || Spacewatch ||  || align=right data-sort-value="0.57" | 570 m || 
|-id=917 bgcolor=#d6d6d6
| 494917 ||  || — || October 2, 2008 || Kitt Peak || Spacewatch ||  || align=right | 2.0 km || 
|-id=918 bgcolor=#d6d6d6
| 494918 ||  || — || October 24, 2008 || Kitt Peak || Spacewatch ||  || align=right | 2.7 km || 
|-id=919 bgcolor=#d6d6d6
| 494919 ||  || — || November 19, 2008 || Mount Lemmon || Mount Lemmon Survey ||  || align=right | 2.6 km || 
|-id=920 bgcolor=#fefefe
| 494920 ||  || — || September 29, 2008 || Mount Lemmon || Mount Lemmon Survey ||  || align=right data-sort-value="0.75" | 750 m || 
|-id=921 bgcolor=#d6d6d6
| 494921 ||  || — || November 20, 2008 || Kitt Peak || Spacewatch ||  || align=right | 2.9 km || 
|-id=922 bgcolor=#fefefe
| 494922 ||  || — || November 22, 2008 || Kitt Peak || Spacewatch ||  || align=right data-sort-value="0.68" | 680 m || 
|-id=923 bgcolor=#d6d6d6
| 494923 ||  || — || November 2, 2008 || Catalina || CSS || TIR || align=right | 3.2 km || 
|-id=924 bgcolor=#fefefe
| 494924 ||  || — || October 26, 2008 || Mount Lemmon || Mount Lemmon Survey ||  || align=right data-sort-value="0.93" | 930 m || 
|-id=925 bgcolor=#d6d6d6
| 494925 ||  || — || December 1, 2008 || Kitt Peak || Spacewatch || ALA || align=right | 5.0 km || 
|-id=926 bgcolor=#d6d6d6
| 494926 ||  || — || November 23, 2008 || Kitt Peak || Spacewatch ||  || align=right | 3.1 km || 
|-id=927 bgcolor=#fefefe
| 494927 ||  || — || November 9, 2008 || Mount Lemmon || Mount Lemmon Survey ||  || align=right | 1.2 km || 
|-id=928 bgcolor=#fefefe
| 494928 ||  || — || November 19, 2008 || Mount Lemmon || Mount Lemmon Survey ||  || align=right data-sort-value="0.65" | 650 m || 
|-id=929 bgcolor=#fefefe
| 494929 ||  || — || December 29, 2008 || Kitt Peak || Spacewatch || NYS || align=right data-sort-value="0.62" | 620 m || 
|-id=930 bgcolor=#d6d6d6
| 494930 ||  || — || December 29, 2008 || Kitt Peak || Spacewatch || ALA || align=right | 3.3 km || 
|-id=931 bgcolor=#fefefe
| 494931 ||  || — || December 21, 2008 || Kitt Peak || Spacewatch ||  || align=right data-sort-value="0.70" | 700 m || 
|-id=932 bgcolor=#fefefe
| 494932 ||  || — || December 22, 2008 || Kitt Peak || Spacewatch ||  || align=right data-sort-value="0.69" | 690 m || 
|-id=933 bgcolor=#FA8072
| 494933 ||  || — || December 21, 2008 || Kitt Peak || Spacewatch || H || align=right data-sort-value="0.56" | 560 m || 
|-id=934 bgcolor=#fefefe
| 494934 ||  || — || January 16, 2009 || Kitt Peak || Spacewatch || MAS || align=right data-sort-value="0.59" | 590 m || 
|-id=935 bgcolor=#fefefe
| 494935 ||  || — || January 16, 2009 || Kitt Peak || Spacewatch ||  || align=right data-sort-value="0.71" | 710 m || 
|-id=936 bgcolor=#fefefe
| 494936 ||  || — || January 16, 2009 || Kitt Peak || Spacewatch || NYS || align=right data-sort-value="0.74" | 740 m || 
|-id=937 bgcolor=#fefefe
| 494937 ||  || — || January 17, 2009 || Kitt Peak || Spacewatch ||  || align=right data-sort-value="0.75" | 750 m || 
|-id=938 bgcolor=#fefefe
| 494938 ||  || — || February 3, 2009 || Kitt Peak || Spacewatch ||  || align=right data-sort-value="0.69" | 690 m || 
|-id=939 bgcolor=#fefefe
| 494939 ||  || — || January 28, 2009 || Socorro || LINEAR || H || align=right data-sort-value="0.87" | 870 m || 
|-id=940 bgcolor=#fefefe
| 494940 ||  || — || February 22, 2009 || Kitt Peak || Spacewatch ||  || align=right data-sort-value="0.63" | 630 m || 
|-id=941 bgcolor=#fefefe
| 494941 ||  || — || February 14, 2009 || Catalina || CSS ||  || align=right | 1.0 km || 
|-id=942 bgcolor=#E9E9E9
| 494942 ||  || — || March 2, 2009 || Kitt Peak || Spacewatch ||  || align=right | 2.1 km || 
|-id=943 bgcolor=#fefefe
| 494943 ||  || — || March 17, 2009 || Kitt Peak || Spacewatch ||  || align=right data-sort-value="0.74" | 740 m || 
|-id=944 bgcolor=#fefefe
| 494944 ||  || — || November 3, 2007 || Mount Lemmon || Mount Lemmon Survey ||  || align=right data-sort-value="0.86" | 860 m || 
|-id=945 bgcolor=#fefefe
| 494945 ||  || — || March 29, 2009 || Kitt Peak || Spacewatch || MAS || align=right data-sort-value="0.71" | 710 m || 
|-id=946 bgcolor=#fefefe
| 494946 ||  || — || April 17, 2009 || Kitt Peak || Spacewatch ||  || align=right data-sort-value="0.73" | 730 m || 
|-id=947 bgcolor=#E9E9E9
| 494947 ||  || — || May 3, 2009 || Kitt Peak || Spacewatch ||  || align=right | 1.2 km || 
|-id=948 bgcolor=#E9E9E9
| 494948 ||  || — || July 28, 2009 || La Sagra || OAM Obs. ||  || align=right data-sort-value="0.80" | 800 m || 
|-id=949 bgcolor=#E9E9E9
| 494949 ||  || — || July 28, 2009 || Tiki || N. Teamo ||  || align=right | 1.3 km || 
|-id=950 bgcolor=#E9E9E9
| 494950 ||  || — || April 30, 2009 || Mount Lemmon || Mount Lemmon Survey ||  || align=right | 1.0 km || 
|-id=951 bgcolor=#E9E9E9
| 494951 ||  || — || August 15, 2009 || Kitt Peak || Spacewatch ||  || align=right | 1.4 km || 
|-id=952 bgcolor=#E9E9E9
| 494952 ||  || — || August 16, 2009 || La Sagra || OAM Obs. ||  || align=right | 1.3 km || 
|-id=953 bgcolor=#d6d6d6
| 494953 ||  || — || September 12, 2009 || Kitt Peak || Spacewatch ||  || align=right | 2.2 km || 
|-id=954 bgcolor=#E9E9E9
| 494954 ||  || — || August 17, 2009 || Catalina || CSS ||  || align=right | 2.0 km || 
|-id=955 bgcolor=#E9E9E9
| 494955 ||  || — || August 15, 2009 || Kitt Peak || Spacewatch ||  || align=right | 2.2 km || 
|-id=956 bgcolor=#E9E9E9
| 494956 ||  || — || September 15, 2009 || Kitt Peak || Spacewatch || HOF || align=right | 1.9 km || 
|-id=957 bgcolor=#fefefe
| 494957 ||  || — || January 6, 2005 || Catalina || CSS || H || align=right data-sort-value="0.86" | 860 m || 
|-id=958 bgcolor=#E9E9E9
| 494958 ||  || — || September 16, 2009 || Kitt Peak || Spacewatch ||  || align=right | 1.9 km || 
|-id=959 bgcolor=#d6d6d6
| 494959 ||  || — || August 27, 2009 || Kitt Peak || Spacewatch || EOS || align=right | 2.8 km || 
|-id=960 bgcolor=#d6d6d6
| 494960 ||  || — || September 18, 2009 || Kitt Peak || Spacewatch ||  || align=right | 2.2 km || 
|-id=961 bgcolor=#C2FFFF
| 494961 ||  || — || September 18, 2009 || Kitt Peak || Spacewatch || L4 || align=right | 6.9 km || 
|-id=962 bgcolor=#d6d6d6
| 494962 ||  || — || September 19, 2009 || Kitt Peak || Spacewatch || EOS || align=right | 2.5 km || 
|-id=963 bgcolor=#fefefe
| 494963 ||  || — || September 29, 2009 || Mount Lemmon || Mount Lemmon Survey ||  || align=right data-sort-value="0.80" | 800 m || 
|-id=964 bgcolor=#E9E9E9
| 494964 ||  || — || October 13, 2009 || Socorro || LINEAR ||  || align=right | 2.4 km || 
|-id=965 bgcolor=#E9E9E9
| 494965 ||  || — || October 15, 2009 || Catalina || CSS ||  || align=right | 2.5 km || 
|-id=966 bgcolor=#d6d6d6
| 494966 ||  || — || September 18, 2009 || Mount Lemmon || Mount Lemmon Survey ||  || align=right | 2.2 km || 
|-id=967 bgcolor=#d6d6d6
| 494967 ||  || — || September 19, 2009 || Mount Lemmon || Mount Lemmon Survey || EOS || align=right | 2.1 km || 
|-id=968 bgcolor=#E9E9E9
| 494968 ||  || — || May 14, 2008 || Mount Lemmon || Mount Lemmon Survey ||  || align=right | 1.9 km || 
|-id=969 bgcolor=#d6d6d6
| 494969 ||  || — || November 8, 2009 || Mount Lemmon || Mount Lemmon Survey || NAE || align=right | 1.8 km || 
|-id=970 bgcolor=#E9E9E9
| 494970 ||  || — || September 16, 2009 || Mount Lemmon || Mount Lemmon Survey || GEF || align=right | 1.8 km || 
|-id=971 bgcolor=#E9E9E9
| 494971 ||  || — || October 26, 2009 || Kitt Peak || Spacewatch ||  || align=right | 2.3 km || 
|-id=972 bgcolor=#d6d6d6
| 494972 ||  || — || October 22, 2009 || Mount Lemmon || Mount Lemmon Survey ||  || align=right | 4.4 km || 
|-id=973 bgcolor=#d6d6d6
| 494973 ||  || — || November 8, 2009 || Kitt Peak || Spacewatch ||  || align=right | 3.6 km || 
|-id=974 bgcolor=#d6d6d6
| 494974 ||  || — || November 10, 2009 || Kitt Peak || Spacewatch ||  || align=right | 3.2 km || 
|-id=975 bgcolor=#FFC2E0
| 494975 ||  || — || November 26, 2009 || Mount Lemmon || Mount Lemmon Survey || APO || align=right data-sort-value="0.51" | 510 m || 
|-id=976 bgcolor=#d6d6d6
| 494976 ||  || — || October 23, 2009 || Mount Lemmon || Mount Lemmon Survey || URS || align=right | 4.5 km || 
|-id=977 bgcolor=#d6d6d6
| 494977 ||  || — || October 25, 2009 || Mount Lemmon || Mount Lemmon Survey ||  || align=right | 2.1 km || 
|-id=978 bgcolor=#d6d6d6
| 494978 ||  || — || September 19, 2009 || Mount Lemmon || Mount Lemmon Survey ||  || align=right | 2.2 km || 
|-id=979 bgcolor=#E9E9E9
| 494979 ||  || — || November 8, 2009 || Kitt Peak || Spacewatch ||  || align=right data-sort-value="0.94" | 940 m || 
|-id=980 bgcolor=#d6d6d6
| 494980 ||  || — || October 17, 2009 || Mount Lemmon || Mount Lemmon Survey || EOS || align=right | 2.6 km || 
|-id=981 bgcolor=#d6d6d6
| 494981 ||  || — || November 21, 2009 || Mount Lemmon || Mount Lemmon Survey ||  || align=right | 2.6 km || 
|-id=982 bgcolor=#d6d6d6
| 494982 ||  || — || December 15, 2009 || Mount Lemmon || Mount Lemmon Survey ||  || align=right | 2.5 km || 
|-id=983 bgcolor=#fefefe
| 494983 ||  || — || January 7, 2010 || Kitt Peak || Spacewatch ||  || align=right data-sort-value="0.49" | 490 m || 
|-id=984 bgcolor=#fefefe
| 494984 ||  || — || January 7, 2010 || Kitt Peak || Spacewatch ||  || align=right data-sort-value="0.55" | 550 m || 
|-id=985 bgcolor=#d6d6d6
| 494985 ||  || — || January 6, 2010 || Catalina || CSS || TIR || align=right | 3.8 km || 
|-id=986 bgcolor=#fefefe
| 494986 ||  || — || January 8, 2010 || Kitt Peak || Spacewatch ||  || align=right data-sort-value="0.71" | 710 m || 
|-id=987 bgcolor=#d6d6d6
| 494987 ||  || — || November 8, 2009 || Mount Lemmon || Mount Lemmon Survey ||  || align=right | 3.2 km || 
|-id=988 bgcolor=#d6d6d6
| 494988 ||  || — || February 5, 2010 || Catalina || CSS || YAK || align=right | 2.6 km || 
|-id=989 bgcolor=#d6d6d6
| 494989 ||  || — || February 14, 2010 || Mount Lemmon || Mount Lemmon Survey || ALA || align=right | 4.1 km || 
|-id=990 bgcolor=#d6d6d6
| 494990 ||  || — || January 12, 2010 || Kitt Peak || Spacewatch || URS || align=right | 3.2 km || 
|-id=991 bgcolor=#fefefe
| 494991 ||  || — || February 9, 2010 || WISE || WISE ||  || align=right | 3.0 km || 
|-id=992 bgcolor=#fefefe
| 494992 ||  || — || January 31, 2003 || Kitt Peak || Spacewatch ||  || align=right data-sort-value="0.59" | 590 m || 
|-id=993 bgcolor=#fefefe
| 494993 ||  || — || March 14, 2010 || Kitt Peak || Spacewatch ||  || align=right data-sort-value="0.73" | 730 m || 
|-id=994 bgcolor=#fefefe
| 494994 ||  || — || March 17, 2010 || Kitt Peak || Spacewatch ||  || align=right data-sort-value="0.69" | 690 m || 
|-id=995 bgcolor=#fefefe
| 494995 ||  || — || April 7, 2010 || Kitt Peak || Spacewatch ||  || align=right data-sort-value="0.68" | 680 m || 
|-id=996 bgcolor=#d6d6d6
| 494996 ||  || — || April 28, 2010 || WISE || WISE || EUP || align=right | 3.6 km || 
|-id=997 bgcolor=#FA8072
| 494997 ||  || — || May 27, 2000 || Socorro || LINEAR ||  || align=right data-sort-value="0.61" | 610 m || 
|-id=998 bgcolor=#fefefe
| 494998 ||  || — || May 5, 2010 || Tzec Maun || E. Schwab ||  || align=right data-sort-value="0.54" | 540 m || 
|-id=999 bgcolor=#FFC2E0
| 494999 ||  || — || May 9, 2010 || Mount Lemmon || Mount Lemmon Survey || ATEPHA || align=right data-sort-value="0.41" | 410 m || 
|-id=000 bgcolor=#fefefe
| 495000 ||  || — || February 7, 2010 || WISE || WISE ||  || align=right | 1.2 km || 
|}

References

External links 
 Discovery Circumstances: Numbered Minor Planets (490001)–(495000) (IAU Minor Planet Center)

0494